= Old Kviteseid Church =

Church in Telemark, Norway

- Kviteseid gamle kyrkje
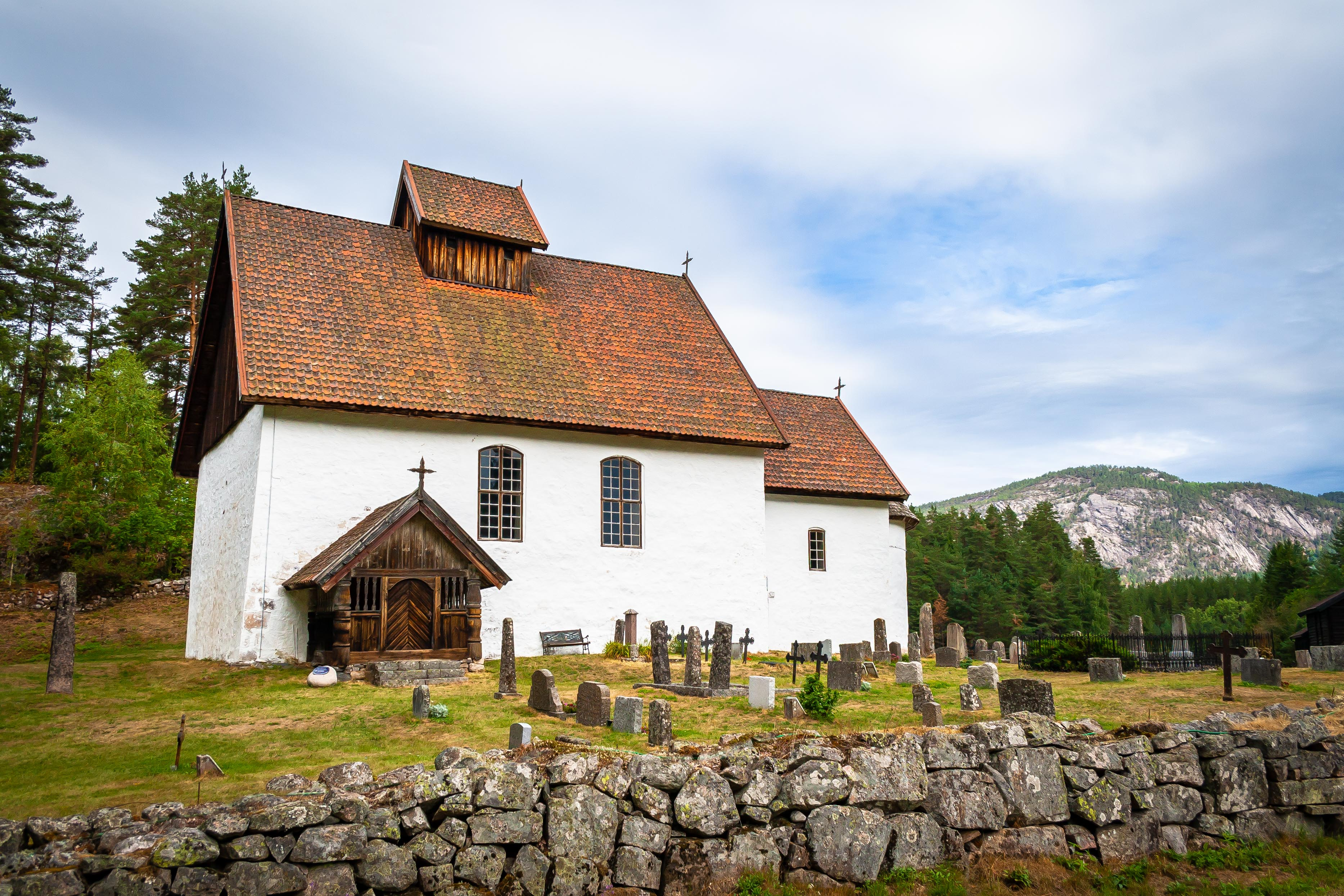
- View of the church
- Old Kviteseid Church
- 59°21′19″N 8°31′26″E
- Location: Kviteseid Municipality, Telemark
- Country: Norway
- Denomination: Church of Norway
- Previous denomination: Catholic Church
- Churchmanship: Evangelical Lutheran

History
- Former name: Kviteseid kirke
- Status: Parish church
- Founded: 13th century
- Consecrated: 13th century

Architecture
- Functional status: Active
- Architectural type: Long church
- Style: Romanesque
- Completed: c. 1260 (766 years ago)

Specifications
- Capacity: 150
- Materials: Stone

Administration
- Diocese: Agder og Telemark bispedømme
- Deanery: Øvre Telemark prosti
- Parish: Kviteseid
- Norwegian Cultural Heritage Site
- Type: Church
- Status: Automatically protected
- ID: 84869

Old Kviteseid Church (Norwegian: Kviteseid gamle kyrkje) is a parish church of the Church of Norway in Kviteseid Municipality in Telemark county, Norway. It is located about 4 kilometres (2.5 mi) north of the village of Eidstod. It is one of the churches in the Kviteseid parish which is part of the Øvre Telemark prosti (deanery) in the Diocese of Agder og Telemark. The white, stone church was built in a long church design around the year 1260 using plans drawn up by an unknown architect. The church seats about 150 people. This is among the better preserved stone churches in Telemark.

The Old Kviteseid Church (known then as simply Kviteseid Church) was the main church of the parish of Kviteseid for about 700 years. Since the parish priest of Kviteseid was also often the provost for the Øvre Telemark prosti (deanery), this church was also the main church of that large region for long periods of time. The church is one of two surviving churches which served as main churches of Øvre Telemark, along with the nearby Seljord Church.

== History ==
The church was built over a period of years during the Middle Ages. Sources are mixed as to when the church was constructed, but it was likely built between the years 1150 and 1260. Dendrochronological dating of the beams in the roof date to around the year 1260, but construction of the stone building must have started many years earlier. The church is built in a Romanesque style and was dedicated to St. Olav. The stone church has a rectangular nave and a rectangular, narrower chancel with an semi-circular apse on the end. The church was built near the north end of the lake Kviteseidvatnet because centuries ago, the waterways were the main transportation routes throughout the municipality, so this was a prime location.

At some point, the western wall of the church was replaced and a window was installed instead of a door, making a door on the south side of the church the main entrance. During the 18th century, a new porch was built at the south door. The choir originally had open rafters, but received a flat ceiling in 1713–1714. Rosemåling was painted by Thomas Blix on the interior walls during this time too. A new altarpiece was installed in 1732.

In 1814, this church served as an election church (Norwegian: valgkirke). Together with more than 300 other parish churches across Norway, it was a polling station for elections to the 1814 Norwegian Constituent Assembly which wrote the Constitution of Norway. This was Norway's first national elections. Each church parish was a constituency that elected people called "electors" who later met together in each county to elect the representatives for the assembly that was to meet at Eidsvoll Manor later that year.

During the 19th century, a small tower was built on the roof of the nave and the two windows on the south wall were greatly enlarged. There are no windows on the north side. During the 1800s, the interior walls were painted white. In the late 1800s, it was decided to move the Kviteseid Church to the village of Kviteseid and to compensate for moving it further to the northwest, the parish would also build a brand new church at Fjågesund to serve the eastern part of the parish. Because of the small size of the parish, it took many years to raise the money needed to construct both new churches. The new Kviteseid Church was built in 1915-1916 and the new building was consecrated on 18 June 1916–the day before the new Fjågesund Church was consecrated. After this, the Old Kviteseid Church was closed down and it was left untouched for several decades before being carefully restored in 1929 and again in 1969. During the restorations, the 19th century white paint was removed to uncover the rosemåling that had been covered up.

Historically prominent individuals were often buried inside the church under the church floor. Several former parish priests of Kviteseid (and provosts of Øvre Telemark) are buried under the church floor, among them Peder Povelsson Paus.

== Media gallery ==
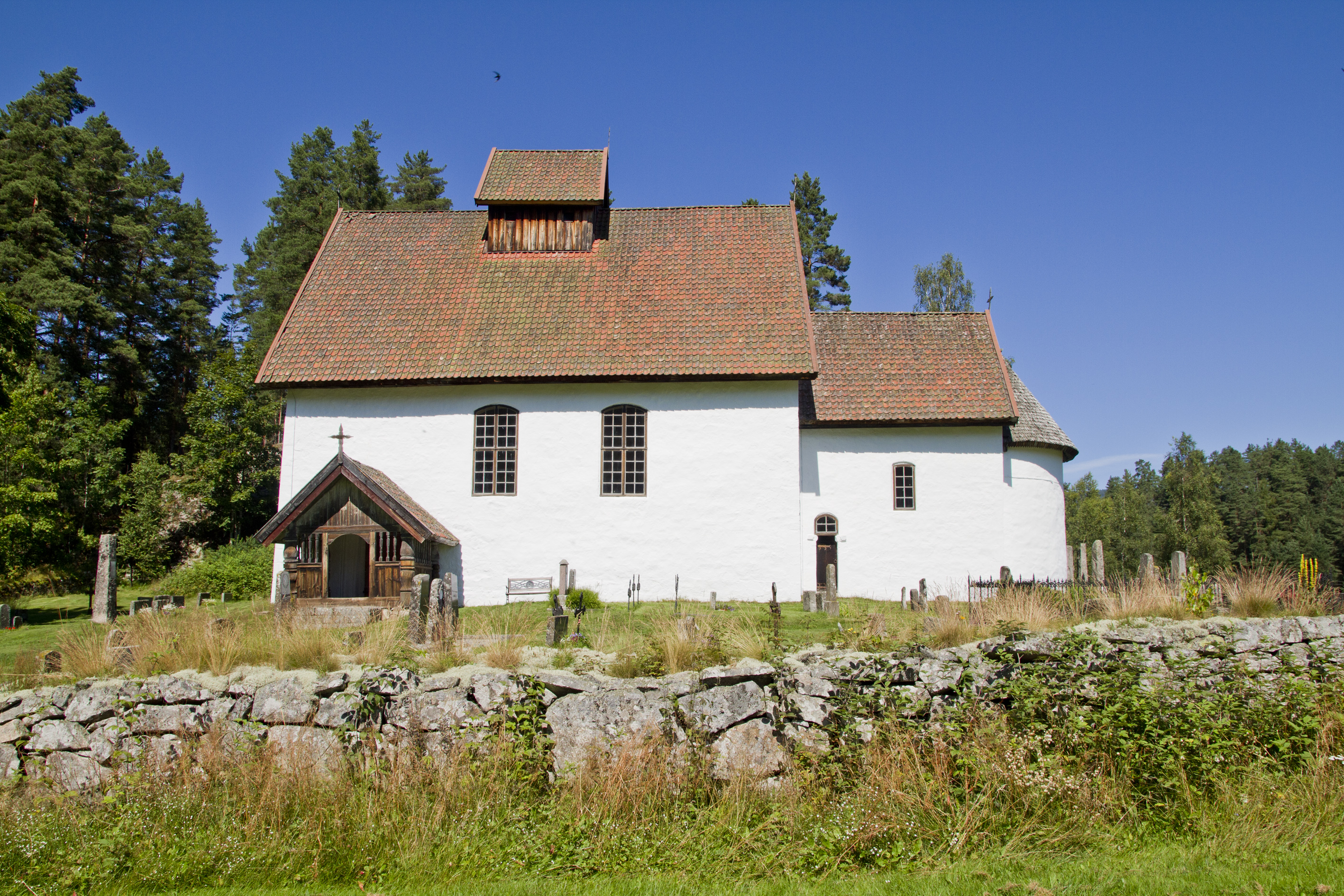

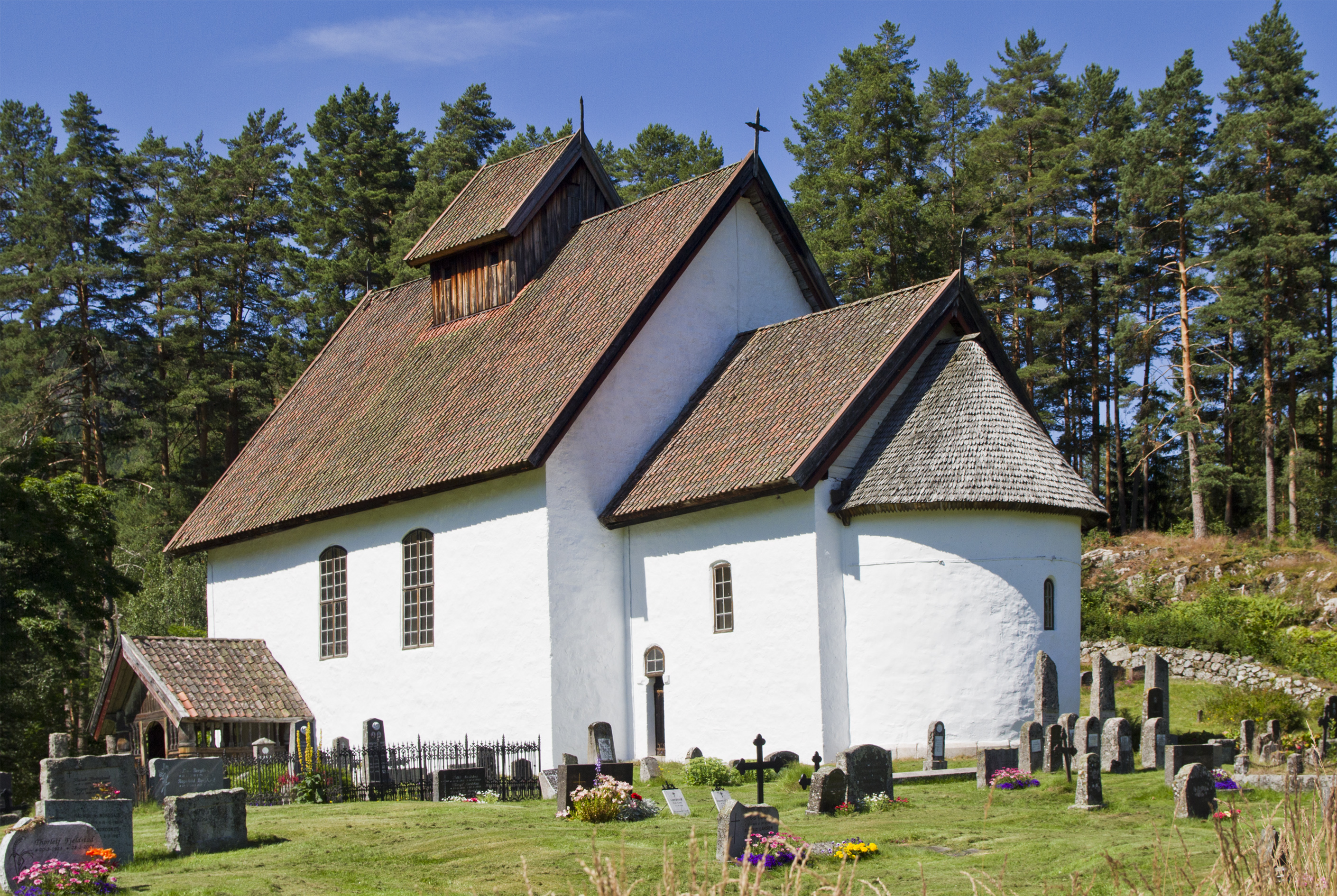

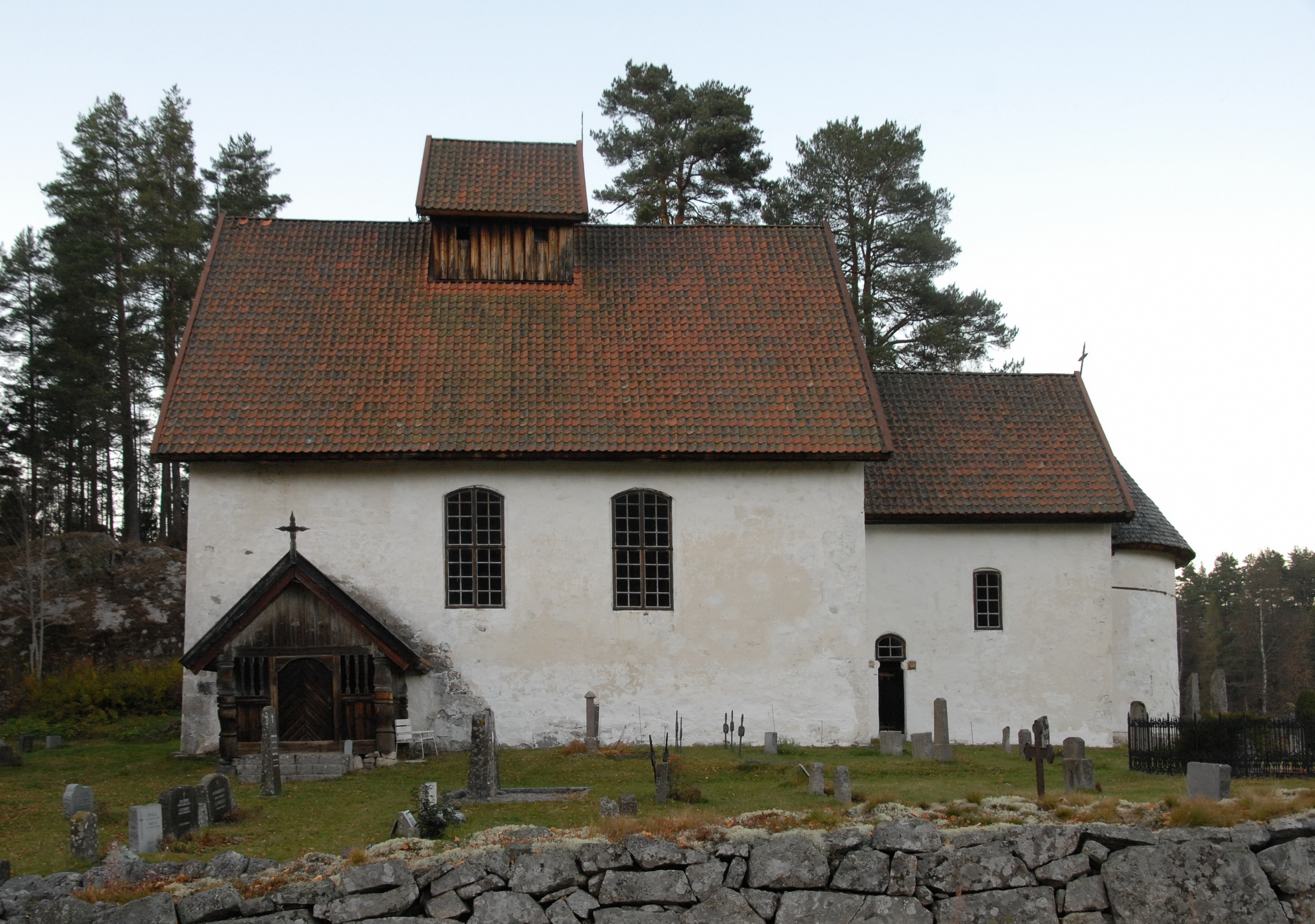

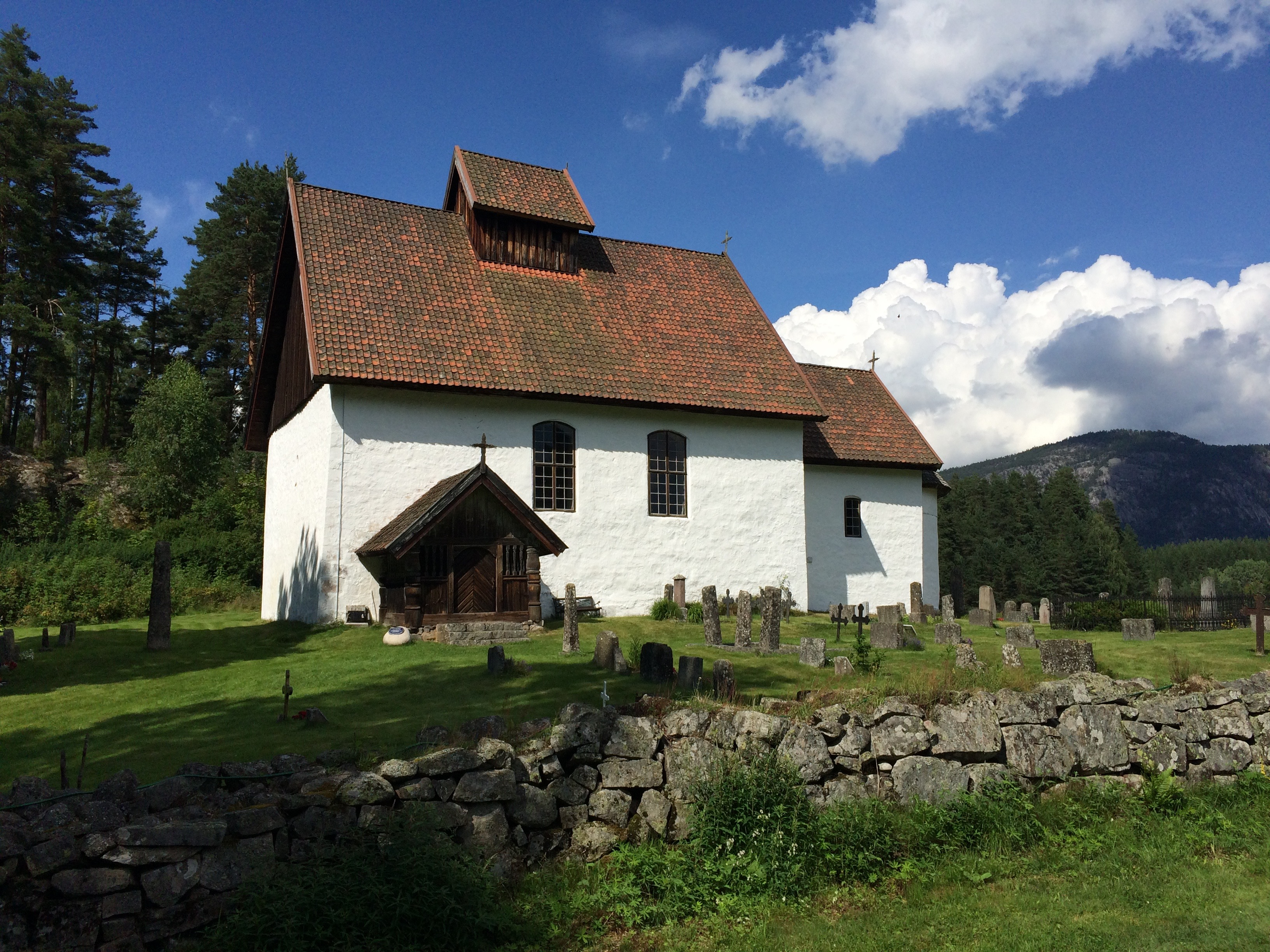

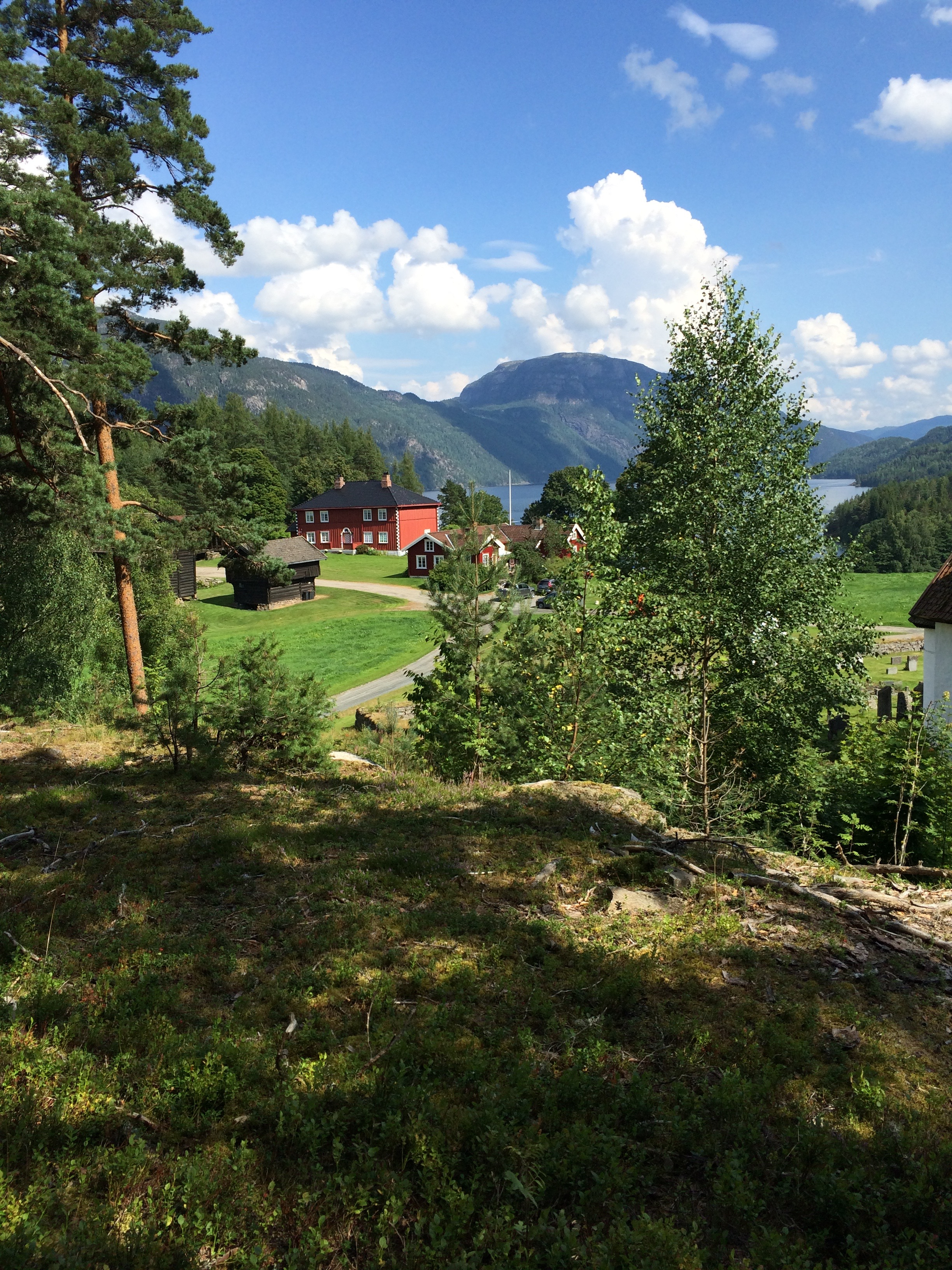

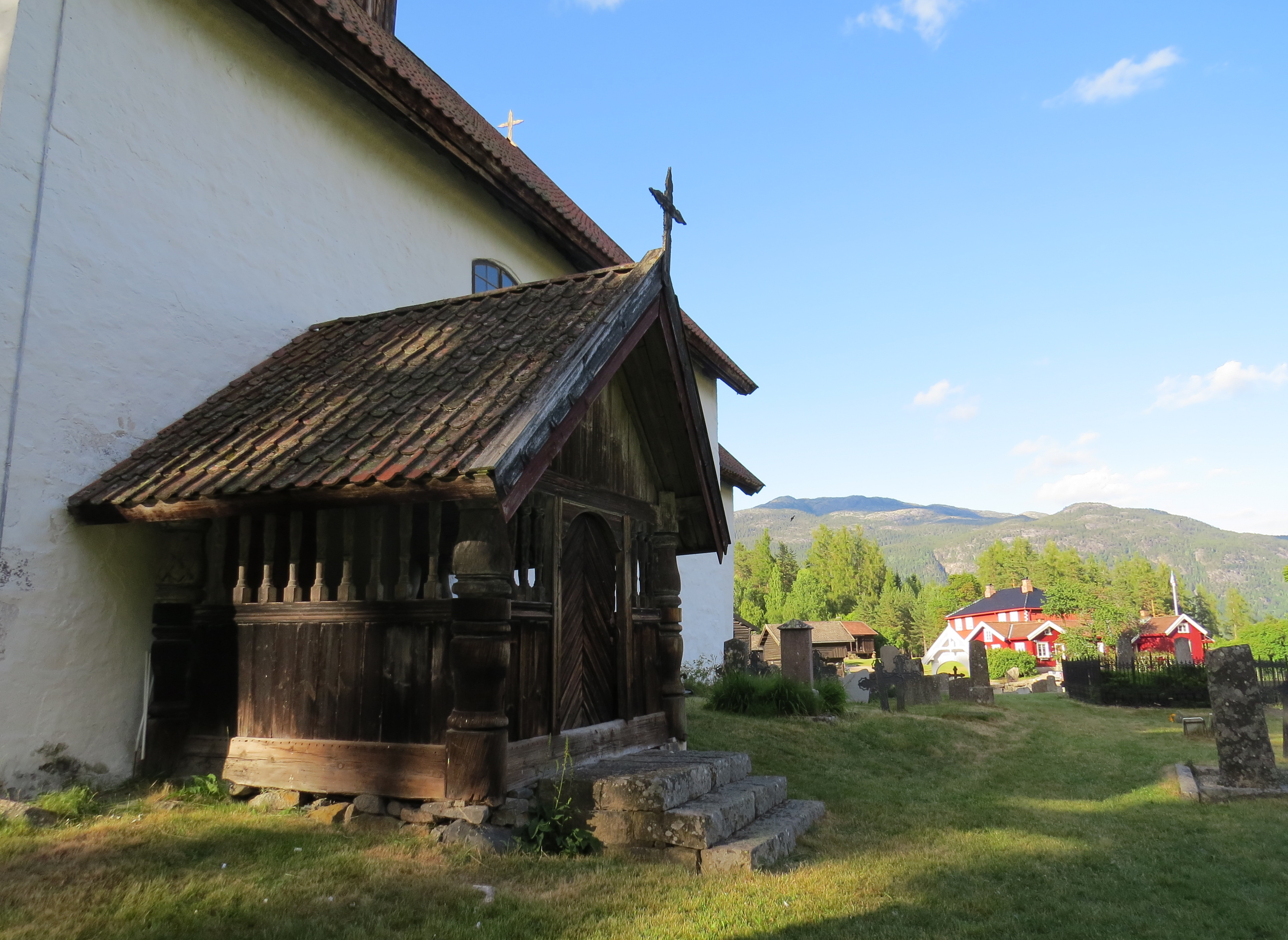

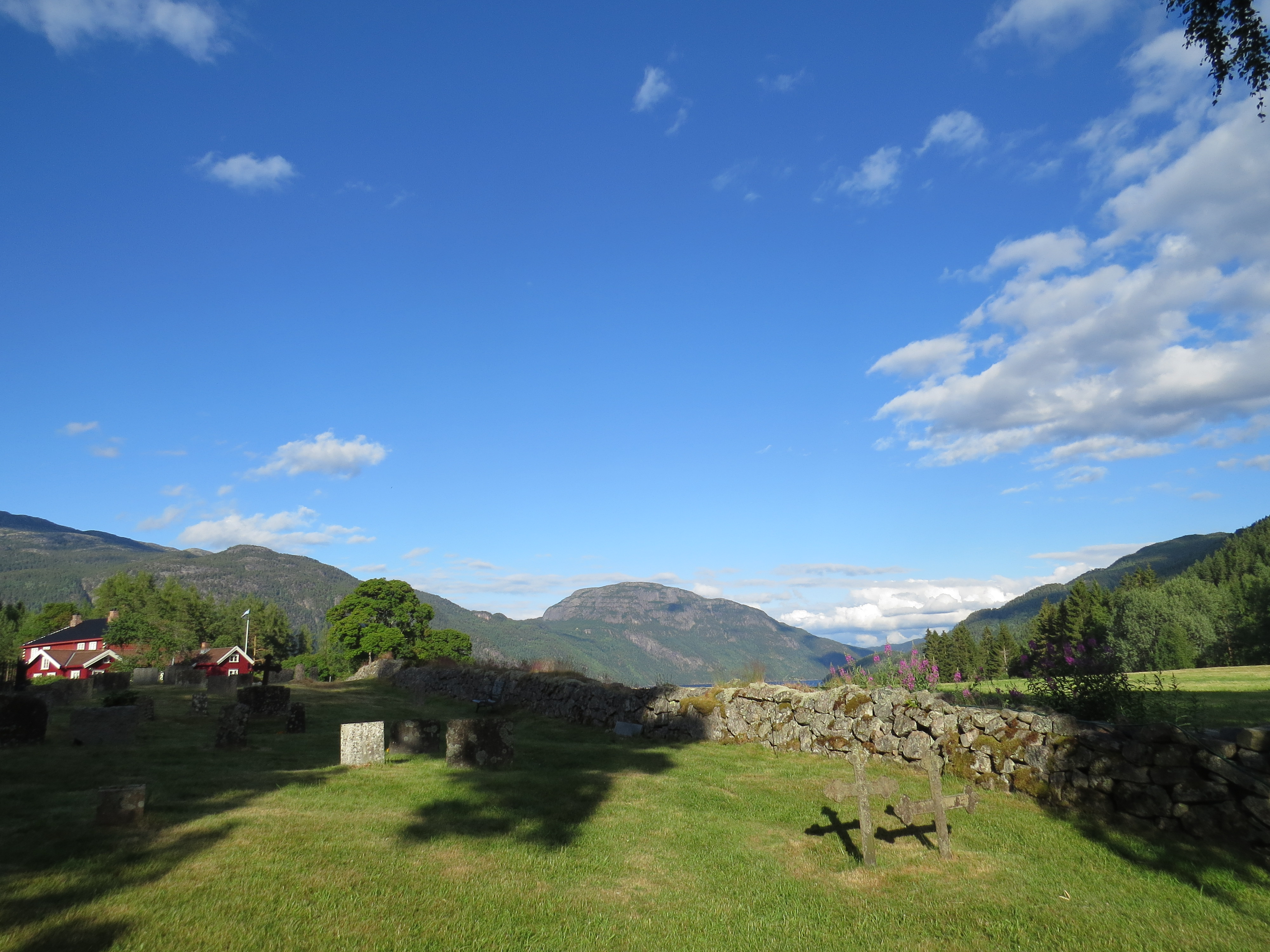
Surrounding view

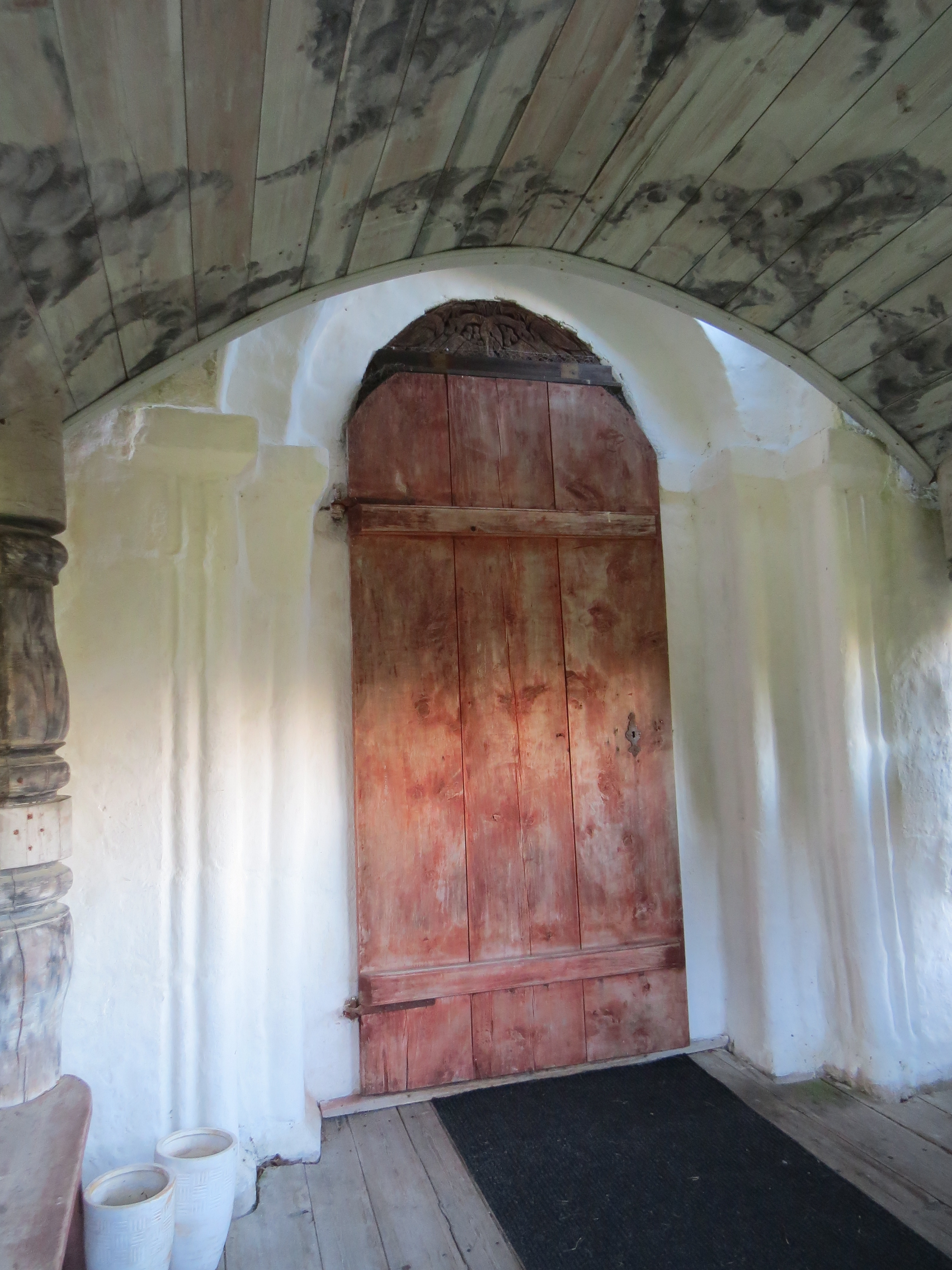

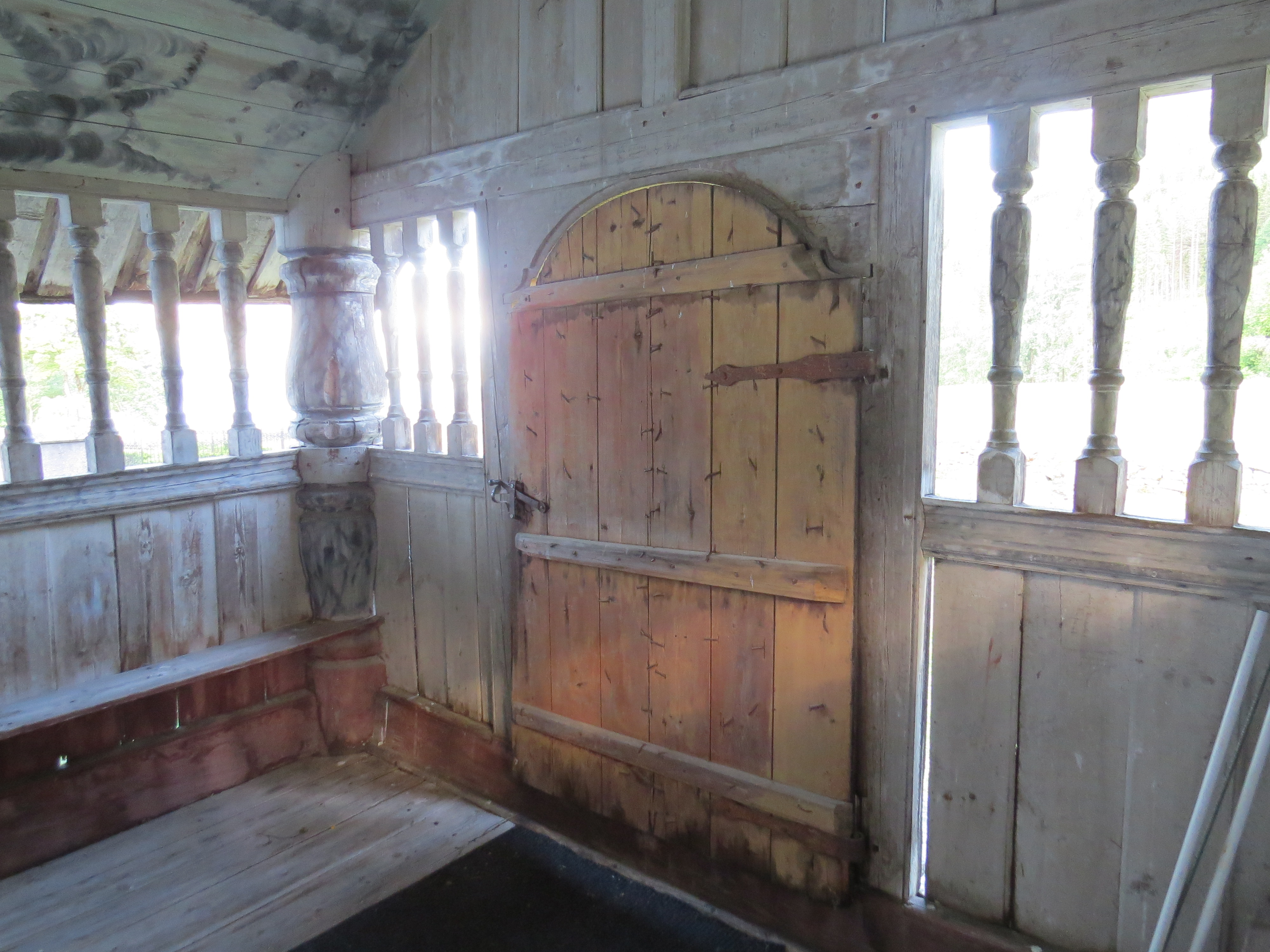

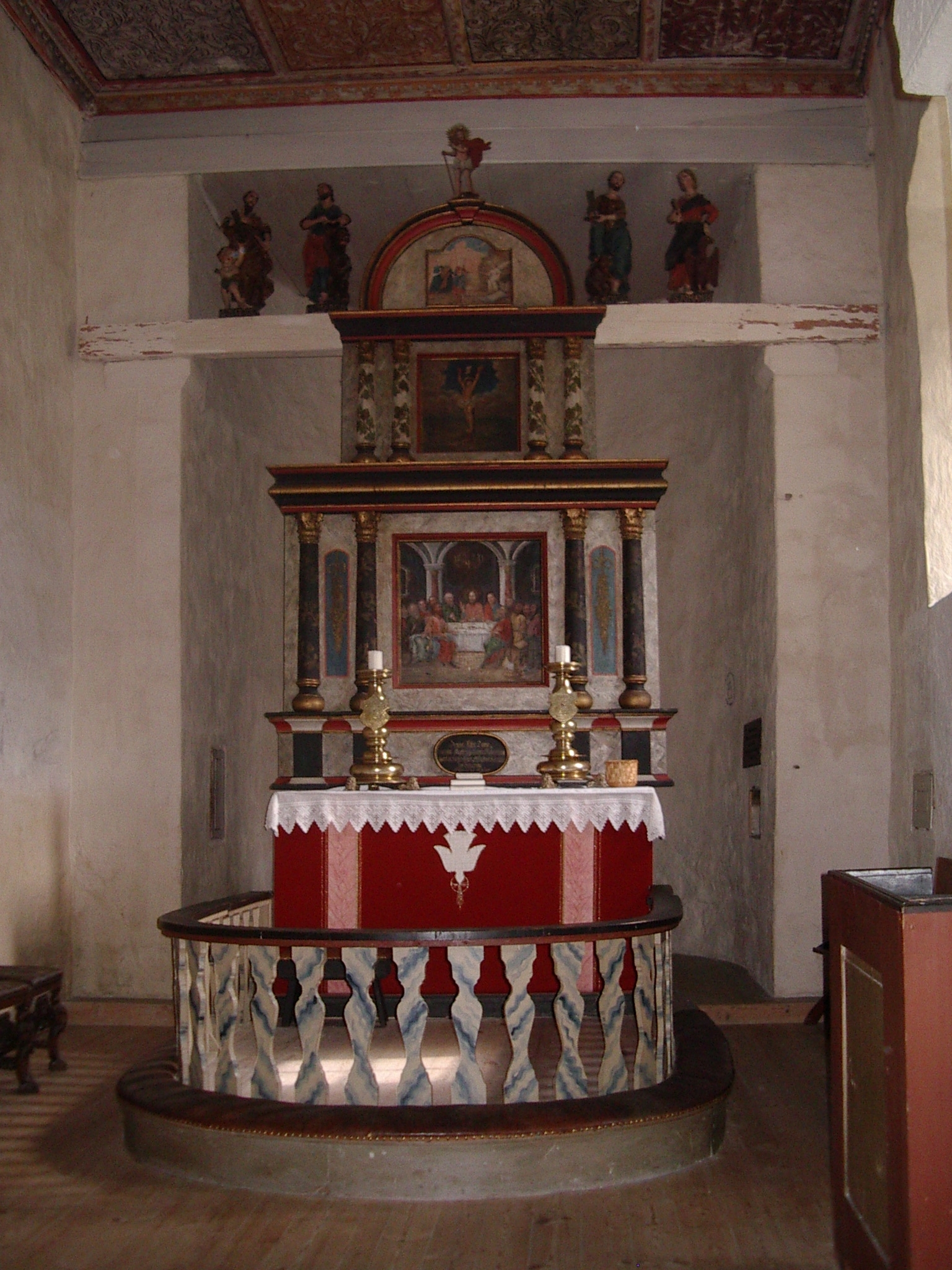

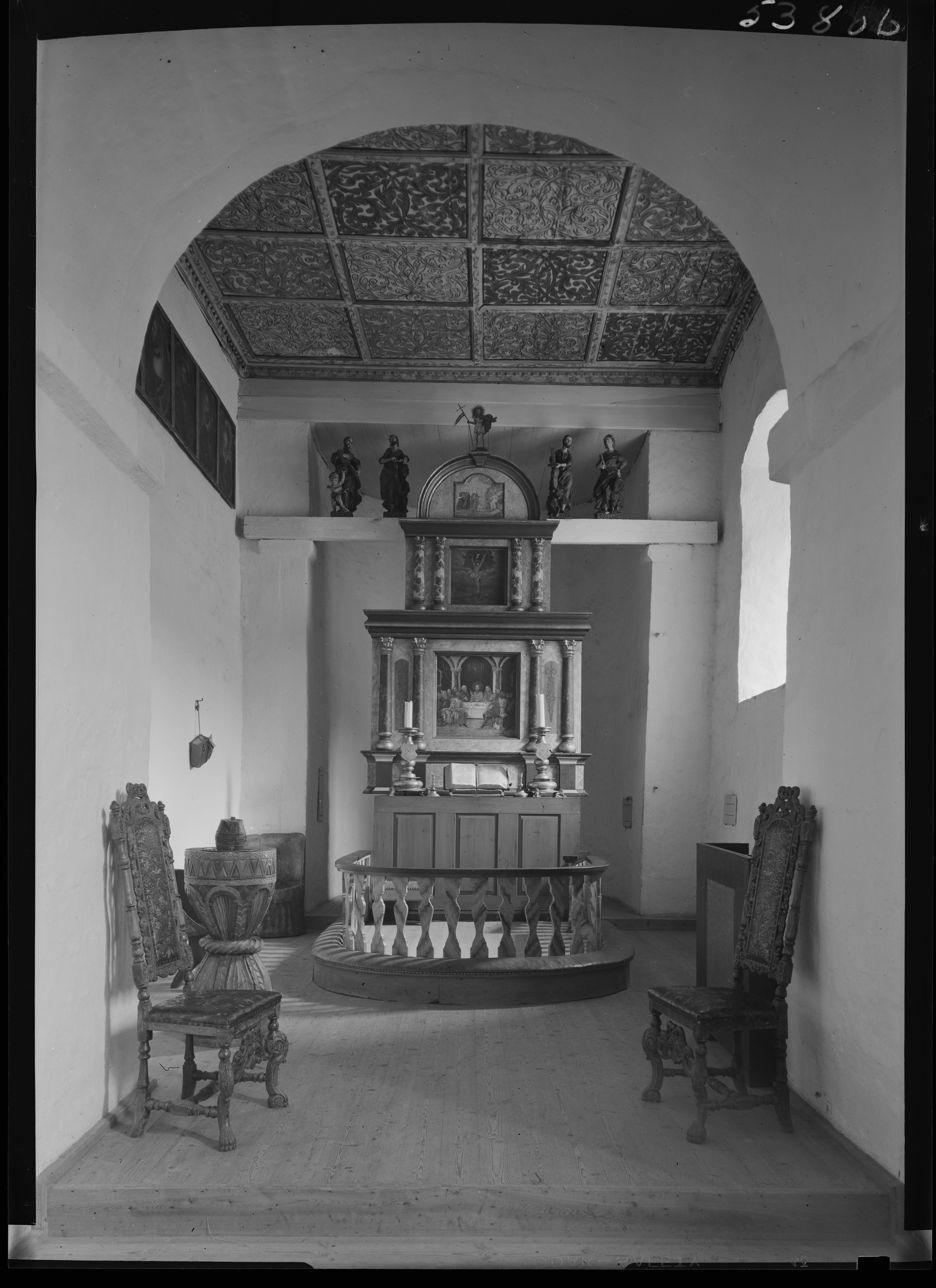

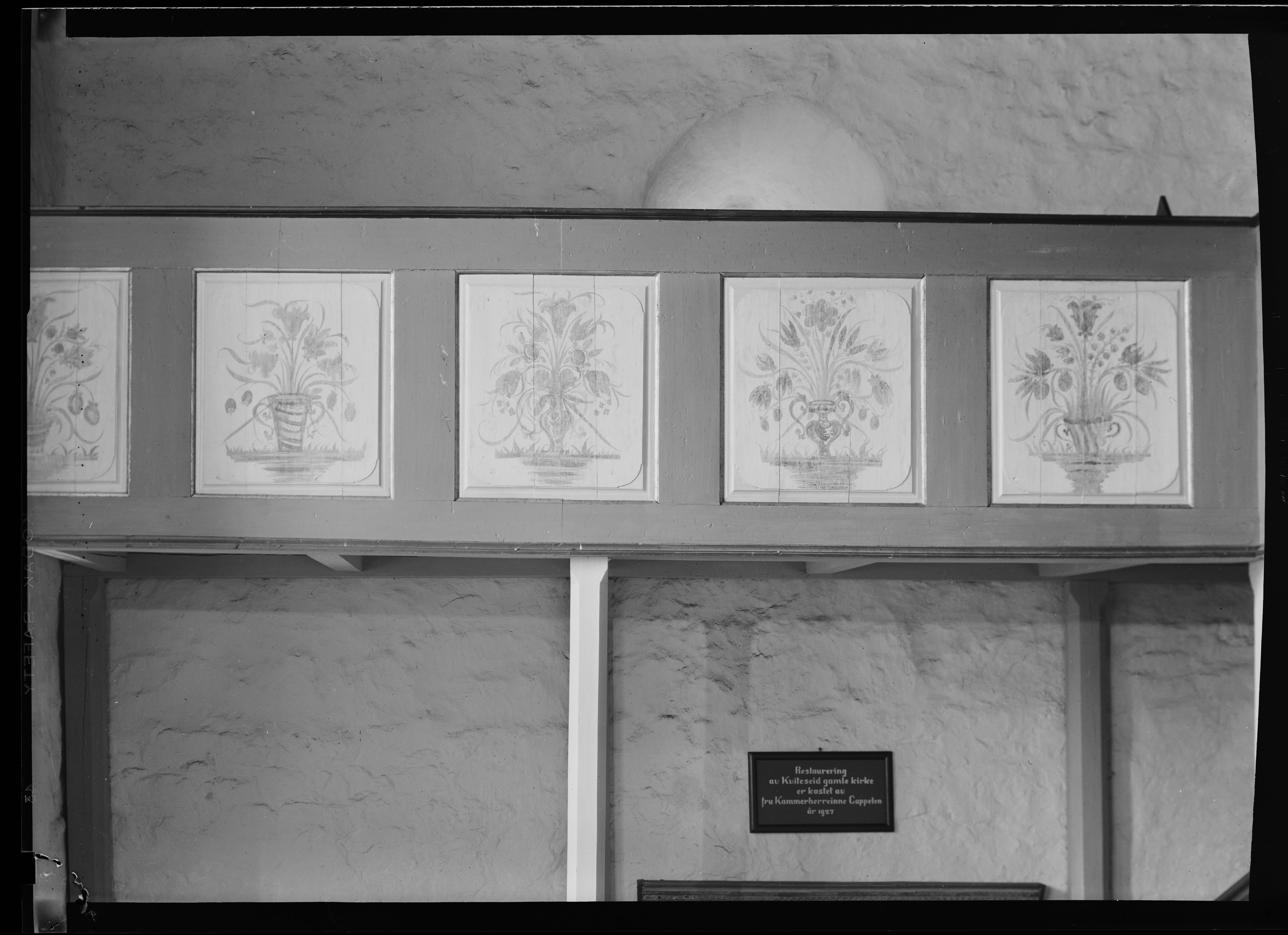

== See also ==
- List of churches in Agder og Telemark
