= Kviteseid =

Kviteseid may refer to:

== Places ==
- Kviteseid Municipality, a municipality in Telemark county, Norway
- Kviteseid (village), a village within Kviteseid Municipality in Telemark county, Norway
- Kviteseid prestegjeld, a former geographic subdivision of the Church of Norway in Telemark county, Norway
- Kviteseid Church, a church in Kviteseid Municipality in Telemark county, Norway
