= Peder Povelsson Paus =

Norwegian high-ranking cleric

Sir Peder Povelsson Paus (Note: Although the family name Paus is attested in his lifetime, he usually omitted it in everyday use in accordance with the custom of the time, and was often known by his given name and patronymic as Peter Paulson; the exact spelling of both names could vary, both in Latinized and Norwegian versions. His given name may be spelled Peder, Peter or in Latin Petrus; his patronymic is often spelled e.g. Povlsen, Povelsen, Povelsson, Paulson, Paulsson or in Latin Paulinus or Paullinus. In formal documents his name would typically be rendered in Latin, e.g. as Petrus Paullinus Asloensis [Peter Paulson of Oslo] in the records of the University of Copenhagen. As a member of the clergy, one of the two privileged estates, he was styled as herr in Norwegian or Dominus in Latin, conventionally rendered as Sir as an ecclesiastical title in English; the Norwegian style herr was (until the 19th century) reserved for members of the clergy and the nobility and may be translated as "Sir" or "Lord"; its predecessor sira (sir) had been introduced as the style for clergymen in Norway in the 13th century and gradually been replaced by the Norwegianized version herr from the 15th century. Locally in Telemark he would typically only be addressed as Sir Per (herr Per, or a variant thereof; Per is a shortened form of Peter).)
- Born: 1590; Oslo
- Died: 21 July 1653 (aged 62–63); Kviteseid
- Other name: Petrus Paulinus Asloensis [Peter Paulson of Oslo]
- Education: Oslo Cathedral School; University of Copenhagen
- Occupation: Cleric
- Children: Paul Peterson Paus

Sir Peder Povelsson Paus (1590 in Oslo – 21 July 1653, in Kviteseid), also rendered as Peter Paus and known locally as Sir Per (Norwegian: herr Per), was a Norwegian high-ranking cleric who served as the provost of the Øvre Telemark prosti from 1633 until his death. As provost he was not only the religious leader of the vast region of Upper Telemark, but also one of the foremost government officials in Telemark; during his lifetime the state church was also an important part of the state administration. He is known through a loving poem in Latin written by his son Paul Peterson Paus in his memory in 1653, In memoriam Domini Petri Pavli ("In Memory of Sir Peter Paulson"). His descendants include the playwright Henrik Ibsen and the singer Ole Paus.

== Life and work ==
He grew up in Oslo together with his brother, fellow priest Sir Hans Paus (b. 1587); the brothers have long been known as the earliest certain ancestors of the family Paus. The fact that both brothers received the best and most costly education available in Denmark-Norway and their apparent social connections to powerful men in Oslo/Eastern Norway – both easily received attractive positions; the education of Peter's nephew was paid for by Chancellor Jens Bjelke, Bishop Oluf Boesen and various members of the high nobility – show that they clearly belonged to the elite of 16th century Oslo. According to S. H. Finne-Grønn, the brothers were almost certainly the sons of burgher of Oslo Povel Hansson (born ca. 1545–50), a son of canon at St Mary's Church Hans Olufsson (died 1570), who held personal noble rank.

Peter attended Oslo Cathedral School, where Bishop Niels Claussøn Senning in 1609 selected him as the third singer of the cathedral school's choir; like his brother he sang alto. He attended the University of Copenhagen from 7 June 1611, and is the first Norwegian appearing in preserved matriculation records of the University of Copenhagen, for centuries Denmark-Norway's only university, under the name Petrus Paulli[nus] Asloensis ("Peter Paulson of Oslo"). Following his studies, he became a member of the clergy of the state church, one of the two (next to the nobility) privileged estates in Denmark-Norway in his lifetime.

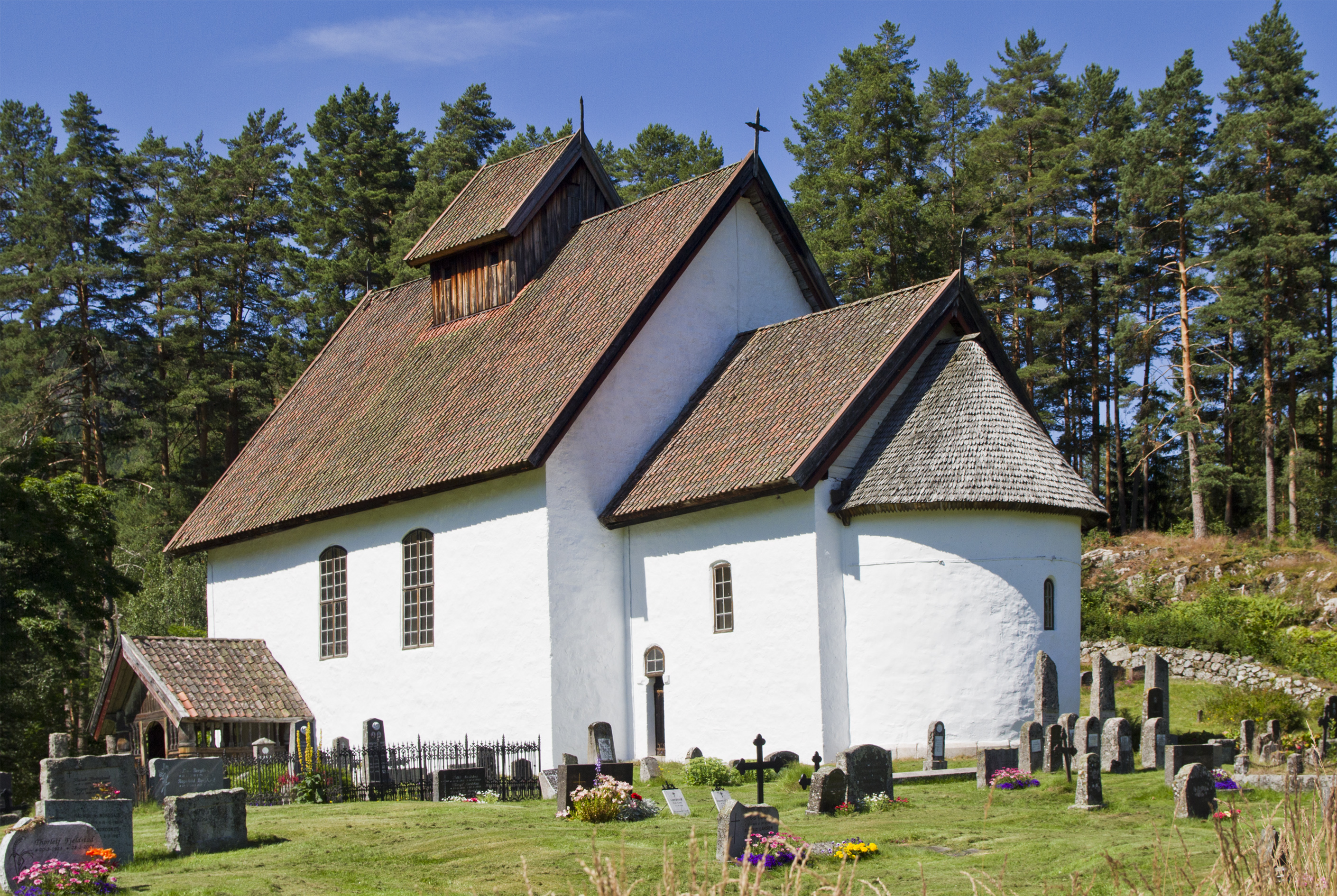
Old Kviteseid Church (built c. 1260), where Peter Paus was priest from 1633 and where he is interred under the choir floor; the church was the religious centre of the vast Upper Telemark region

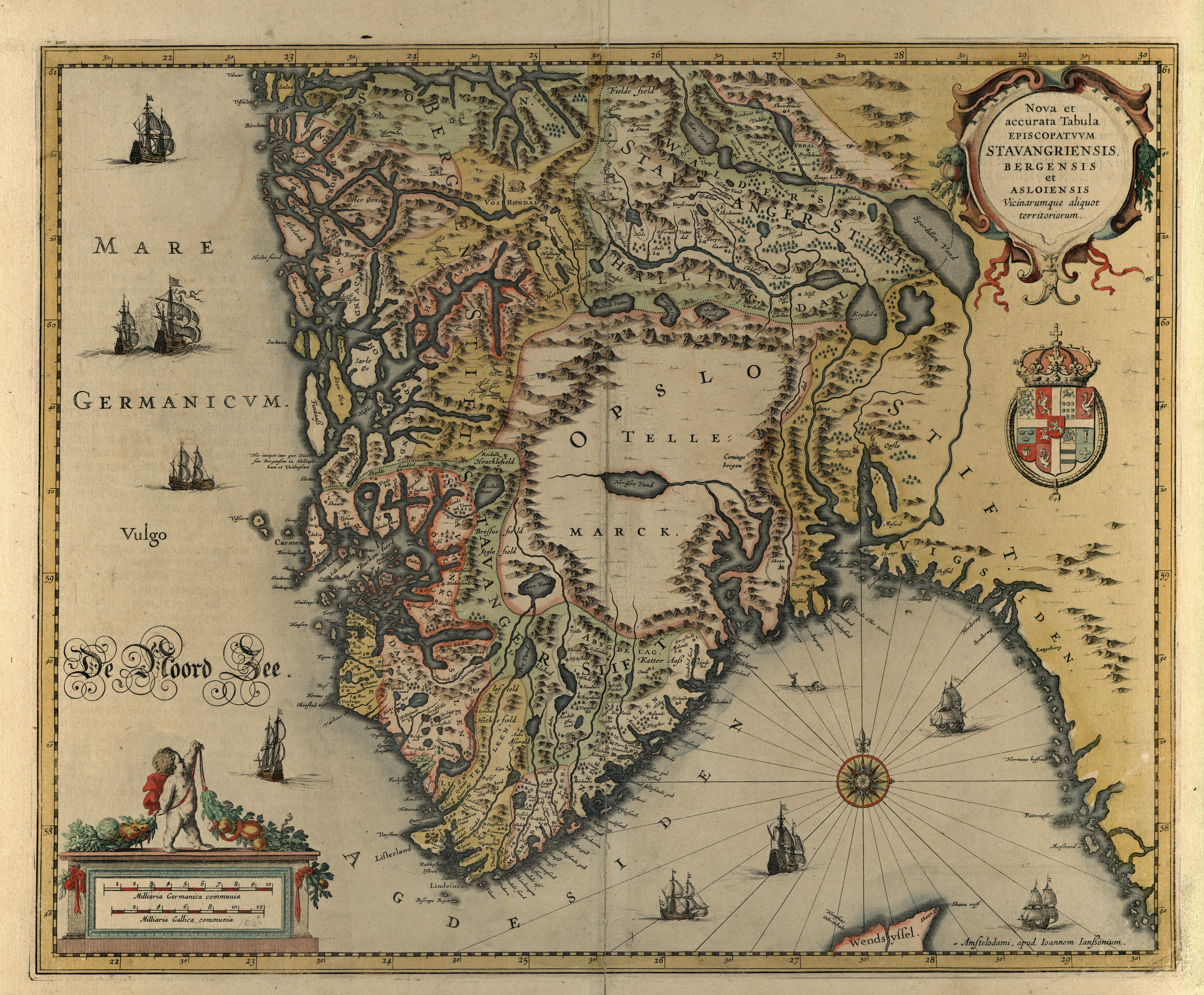
A 1636 map of southern Norway shows (Upper) Telemark as a mostly white field, known for being a remote area inhabited by violent farmers who refused to pay taxes

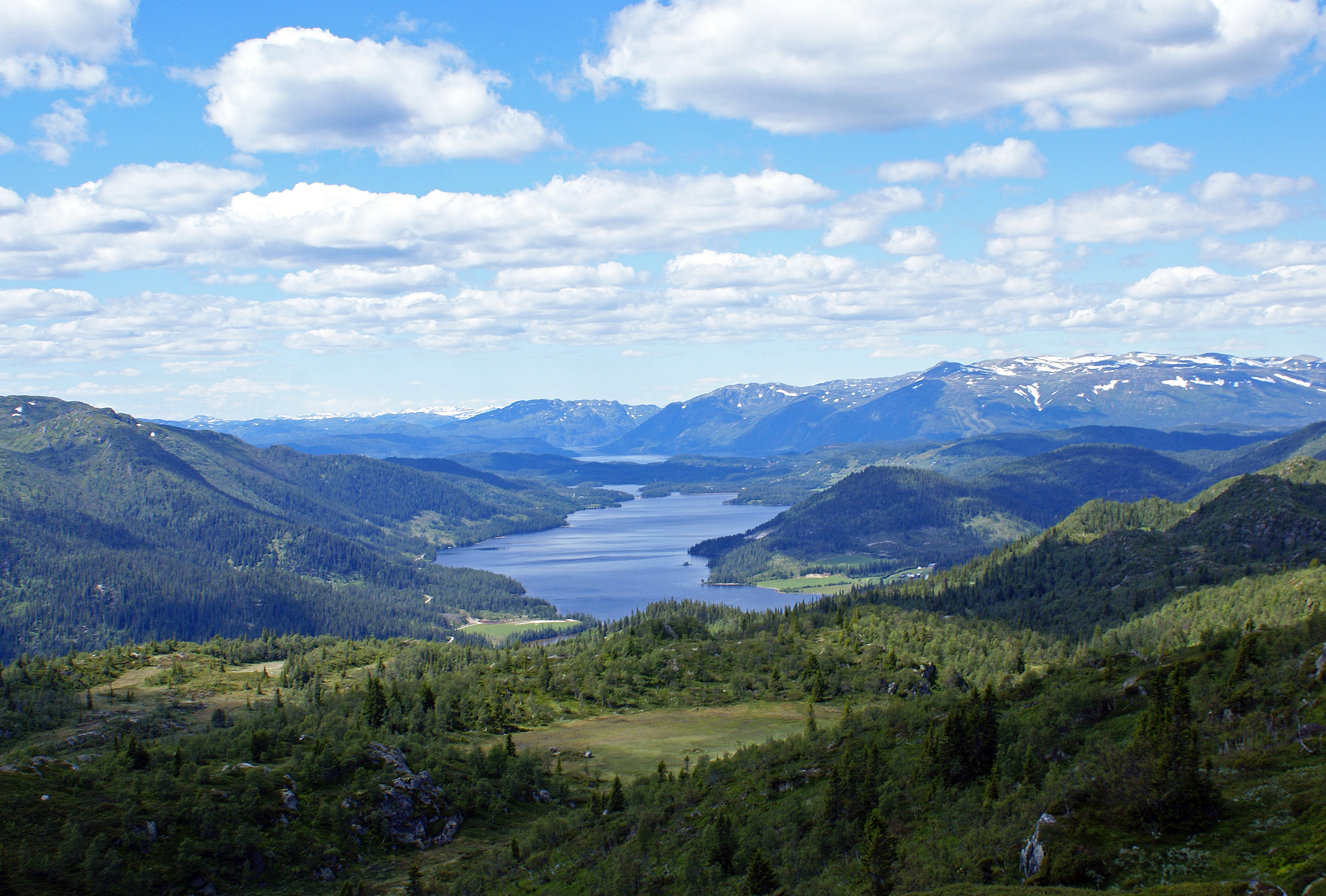
Vinje, where Peter Paus was priest from around 1618 to 1633

He was headmaster of Skien Latin School as of 1617. In 1618 he became chaplain at Vinje Church and around 1621–1622 he became the parson (parish priest) of that district. In his lifetime the parishes were not only religious districts, but also the core territorial units in the state administration; as parson he was the foremost government official in Vinje. Around 1622 he married Johanne Madsdatter; in 1625 his oldest son Paul Paus was born in Vinje. Due to the limited income provided by the very large but sparsely populated, mountainous and geographically remote district, he took a leave of absence in the midwinter of 1633 and went with his family to Oslo, where he immediately became a "12 o'clock priest" at Oslo Cathedral; the "12 o'clock priest" was responsible for the 12 o'clock sermon which was aimed particularly at young people and included the reading and explanation of the Catechism. His daughter Helvig Paus (1633–1693) was born in Oslo on 12 July in that year.

In the same year he was appointed by King Christian IV of Denmark-Norway as parson (parish priest) of the wealthy and less remote district of Kviteseid (which then also included Brunkeberg, Nissedal, Treungen and Vrådal), in succession to the late Sir Jens Michelsen. He was then additionally immediately elected as the new provost of all of the Øvre Telemark prosti, also in succession to Sir Jens. As provost he was not only the religious leader of the vast region of Upper Telemark, but also one of the foremost government officials in Telemark; Norway was at the time divided into around 40 provostships, larger territorial units that comprised multiple parishes, and the provost ranked between the parsons and the bishops. He lived at Kviteseid Farm, the largest farm in Kviteseid. From the 17th to the 19th century, his descendants were among the foremost of the regional elite, the close-knit "aristocracy of officials" in Upper Telemark, where many family members served as priests, judges and other officials and where several state and church offices in practice were hereditary in the family for extended periods. Peter Paus is the progenitor of all extant male lines of the family Paus. His descendants include the playwright Henrik Ibsen, the singer Ole Paus and the composer Marcus Paus.

Peter was interred under the choir floor in the upper part of the Old Kviteseid Church. His son Sir Paul Peterson Paus (1625–1682), who was parish priest at Hjartdal Church and who was regarded as a learned and contemplative personality, wrote the Latin poem "In memoriam Domini Petri Pavli" in "eternal memory of a deceased father written by his grieving son." The poem in hexa- and pentameters is formed as an acrostic which together forms the phrase Petrus Pavli fi[liu]s pastor præpositus ("Peter Paulson pastor provost"). The first verse reads in English translation:

Sing with me, my flute, a sorrowful song!
bring forth trembling mournful songs!
Cry, you Parcae, over the sorrowful death of our dear father
and then record his destiny in worthy rhythms

— Paul Peterson Paus, "In memoriam Domini Petri Pavli" (1653)

The original was on display at the Old Kviteseid Church from 1653 until it was given to the university library in Oslo by the widow of Magnus Brostrup Landstad in the 19th century. Peter Paulson Paus was succeeded as provost of Upper Telemark by Sakarias Jonsson Skancke. The tradition of Peter's great physical powers have been handed down in Kviteseid until the modern age.

== Notes ==
Religious titles
Preceded by Jens Michelsen	Provost of Øvre Telemark prosti 1633–1653	Succeeded by Sakarias Jonsson Skancke
