= Fjågesund =

Village in Kviteseid Municipality, Norway

- Village
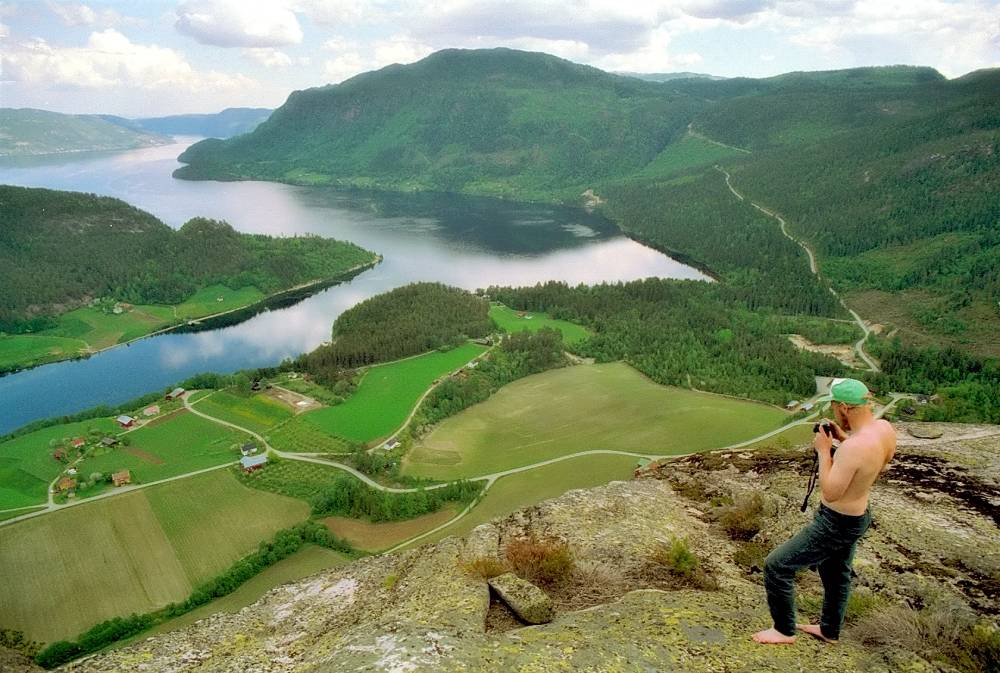
- View of the village
- Interactive map of Fjågesund
- Coordinates: 59.30312°N 8.69415°E
- Country: Norway
- Region: Eastern Norway
- County: Telemark
- District: Vest-Telemark
- Municipality: Kviteseid Municipality
- Elevation: 92 m (302 ft)
- Time zone: UTC+01:00 (CET)
  - Summer (DST): UTC+02:00 (CEST)
- Post Code: 3850 Kviteseid

Fjågesund is a village in Kviteseid Municipality in Telemark county, Norway. The village is located at the west end of the lake Flåvatn and the southeastern end of the lake Kviteseidvatnet, about mid-way along the Telemark Canal. It is located about 10 kilometres (6.2 mi) to the southwest of the village of Kilen and about 20 kilometres (12 mi) to the southeast of the village of Kviteseidbyen.

The 300-metre (980 ft) tall cliff on the mountain Ånås is located just to the west of the village. Fjågesund Church is located in the village and the village had its own school from 1911 until 2010 when it was closed.
