= Flåbygd =

Village in Nome Municipality, Norway

- Village
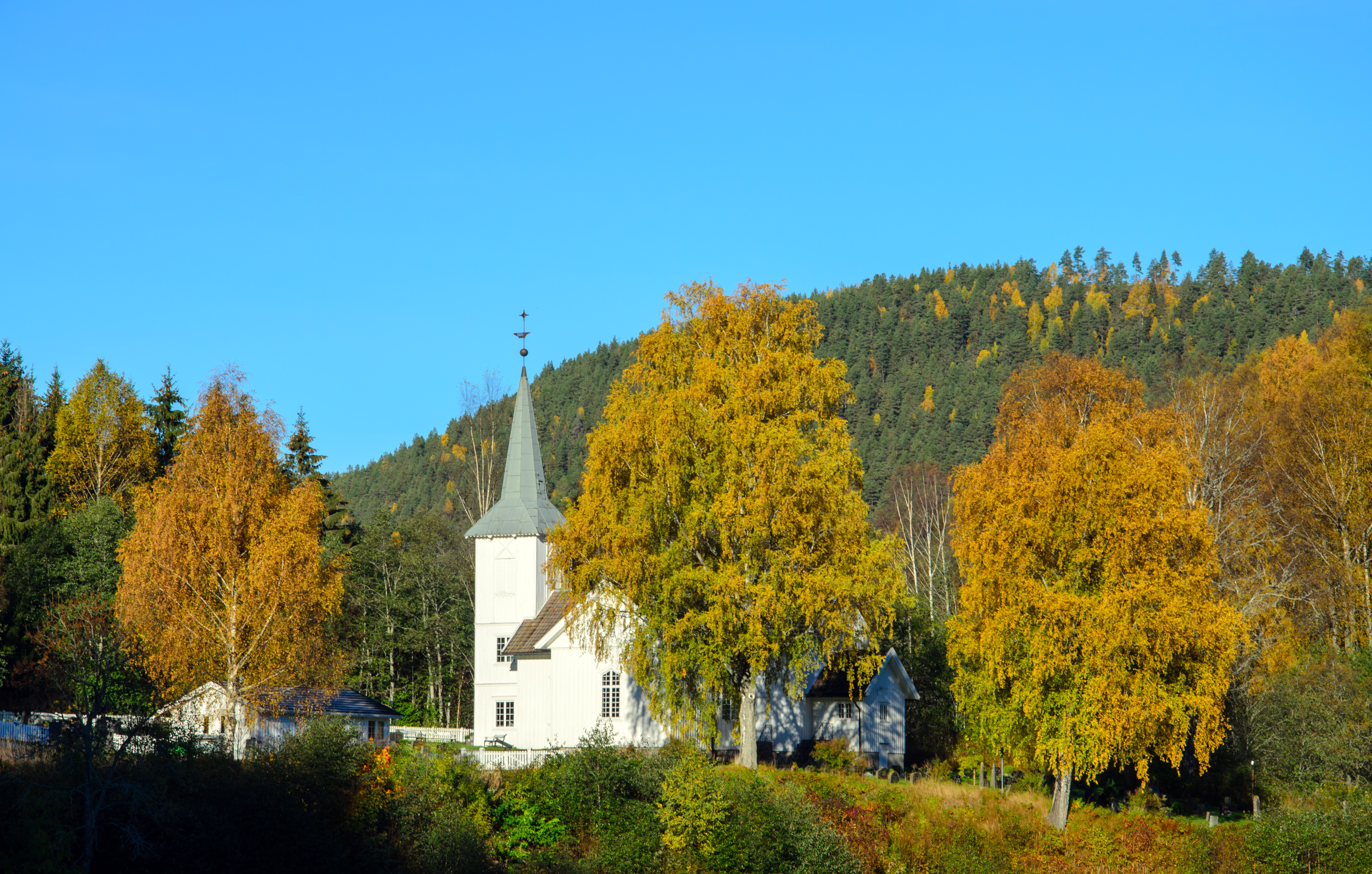
- View of the village church
- Interactive map of Flåbygd
- Coordinates: 59.31667°N 9°E
- Country: Norway
- Region: Eastern Norway
- County: Telemark
- District: Midt-Telemark
- Municipality: Nome Municipality
- Elevation: 144 m (472 ft)
- Time zone: UTC+01:00 (CET)
  - Summer (DST): UTC+02:00 (CEST)
- Post Code: 3825 Lunde

Flåbygd is a village in Nome Municipality in Telemark county, Norway. The village is located at the eastern end of the lake Flåvatn. The village of Bjervamoen lies about 10 kilometres (6.2 mi) to the east and the village of Kilen is located about 15 kilometres (9.3 mi) to the west (in Kviteseid Municipality). Flåbygd Church is located in the village. The local economy is centered on agriculture.
