= Kilen Chapel =

Church in Telemark, Norway

- Kilen kapell
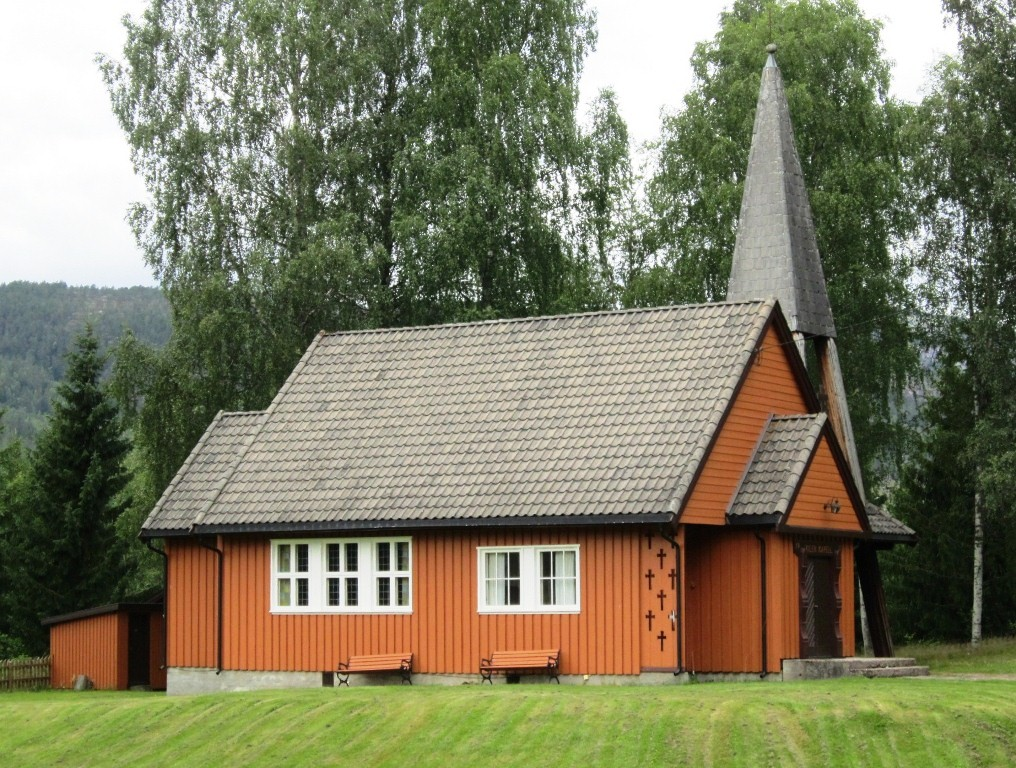
- View of the church
- Kilen Chapel
- 59°20′06″N 8°48′16″E
- Location: Kviteseid Municipality, Telemark
- Country: Norway
- Denomination: Church of Norway
- Churchmanship: Evangelical Lutheran

History
- Status: Parish church
- Founded: 1958
- Consecrated: 10 August 1958

Architecture
- Functional status: Active
- Architect: T. Bjåen
- Architectural type: Long church
- Completed: 1958 (68 years ago)

Specifications
- Capacity: 88
- Materials: Wood

Administration
- Diocese: Agder og Telemark
- Deanery: Øvre Telemark prosti
- Parish: Kviteseid
- Norwegian Cultural Heritage Site
- Type: Church
- Status: Not protected
- ID: 84771

Kilen Chapel (Norwegian: Kilen kapell) is a parish church of the Church of Norway in Kviteseid Municipality in Telemark county, Norway. It is located in the village of Kilen. It is one of the churches in the Kviteseid parish which is part of the Øvre Telemark prosti (deanery) in the Diocese of Agder og Telemark. The orange, wooden church was built in a long church design in 1958 using plans drawn up by the architect T. Bjåen from Horten. The church seats about 88 people.

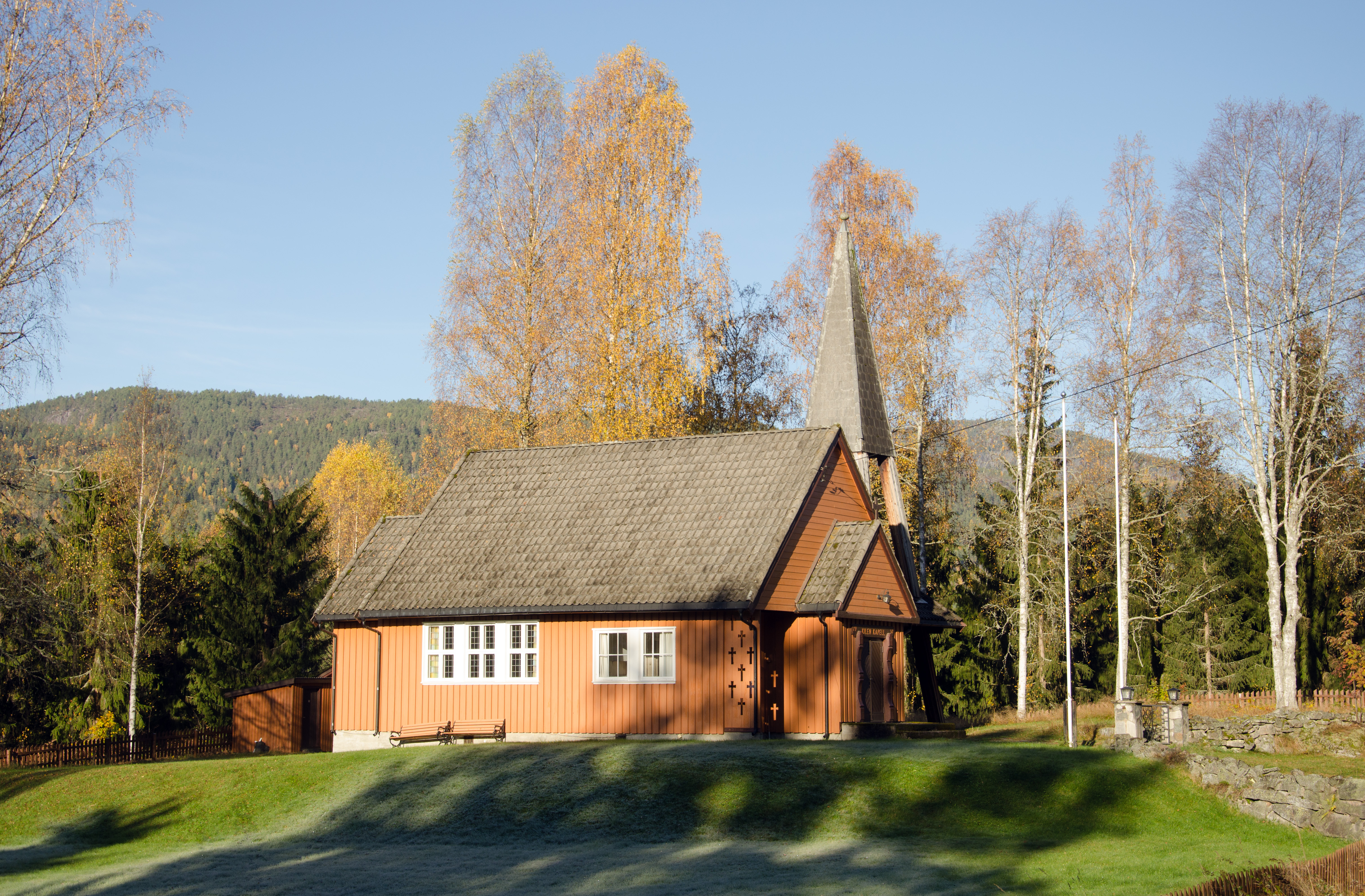
View of the church

== History ==
The village of Kilen stood fairly isolated for centuries, with the best means of access by boat on the lake Flåvatn. As large forest owners in the area, the Aall family had intended to build a chapel here as early as the 19th century to serve the local population, but this dream never came to fruition. Instead, a local fundraising initiative started in 1945. By 1957, enough money had been collected. The chapel was constructed in 1958 using volunteer labour. The building was designed by Torjus Bjåen and it was consecrated on 10 August 1958. It was Kaare Støylen's first duty as the new bishop of the diocese. For many years, the chapel was part of a joint parish with Fjågesund Church until all the churches in the municipality were merged into one parish.

== See also ==
- List of churches in Agder og Telemark
