= Eidstod =

Village in Kviteseid Municipality, Norway

- Village
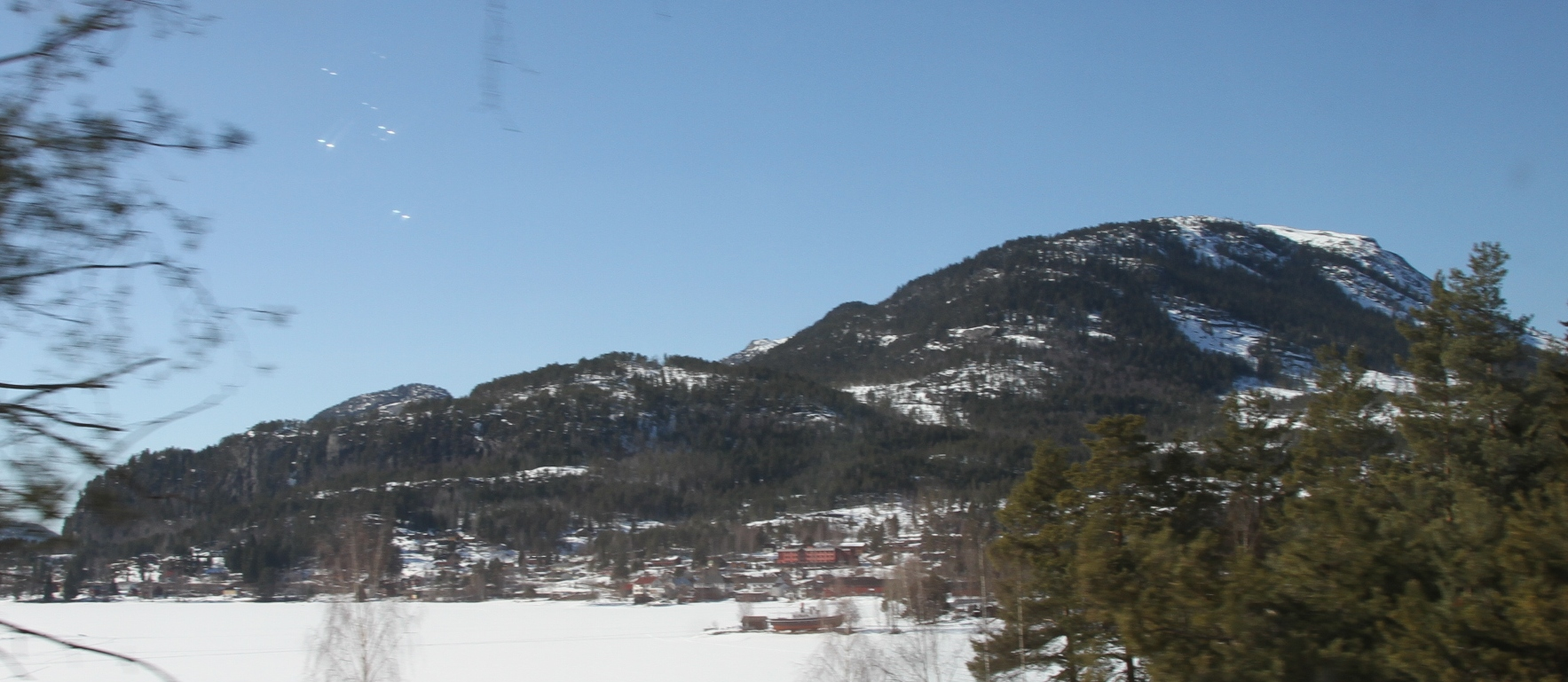
- View of the village
- Interactive map of Eidstod
- Coordinates: 59.32535°N 8.47899°E
- Country: Norway
- Region: Eastern Norway
- County: Telemark
- District: Vest-Telemark
- Municipality: Kviteseid Municipality
- Elevation: 265 m (869 ft)
- Time zone: UTC+01:00 (CET)
  - Summer (DST): UTC+02:00 (CEST)
- Post Code: 3853 Vrådal

Eidstod is a village in Kviteseid Municipality in Telemark county, Norway. The village is located at the northern end of the lake Nisser and it is the main population centre in the Vrådal area. The Norwegian National Road 41 runs along the eastern side of the village. The village of Kviteseid is located about 10 kilometres (6.2 mi) to the north and the village of Fjågesund lies about 15 kilometres (9.3 mi) to the east.
