= MS Henrik Ibsen =

20th-century passenger ship

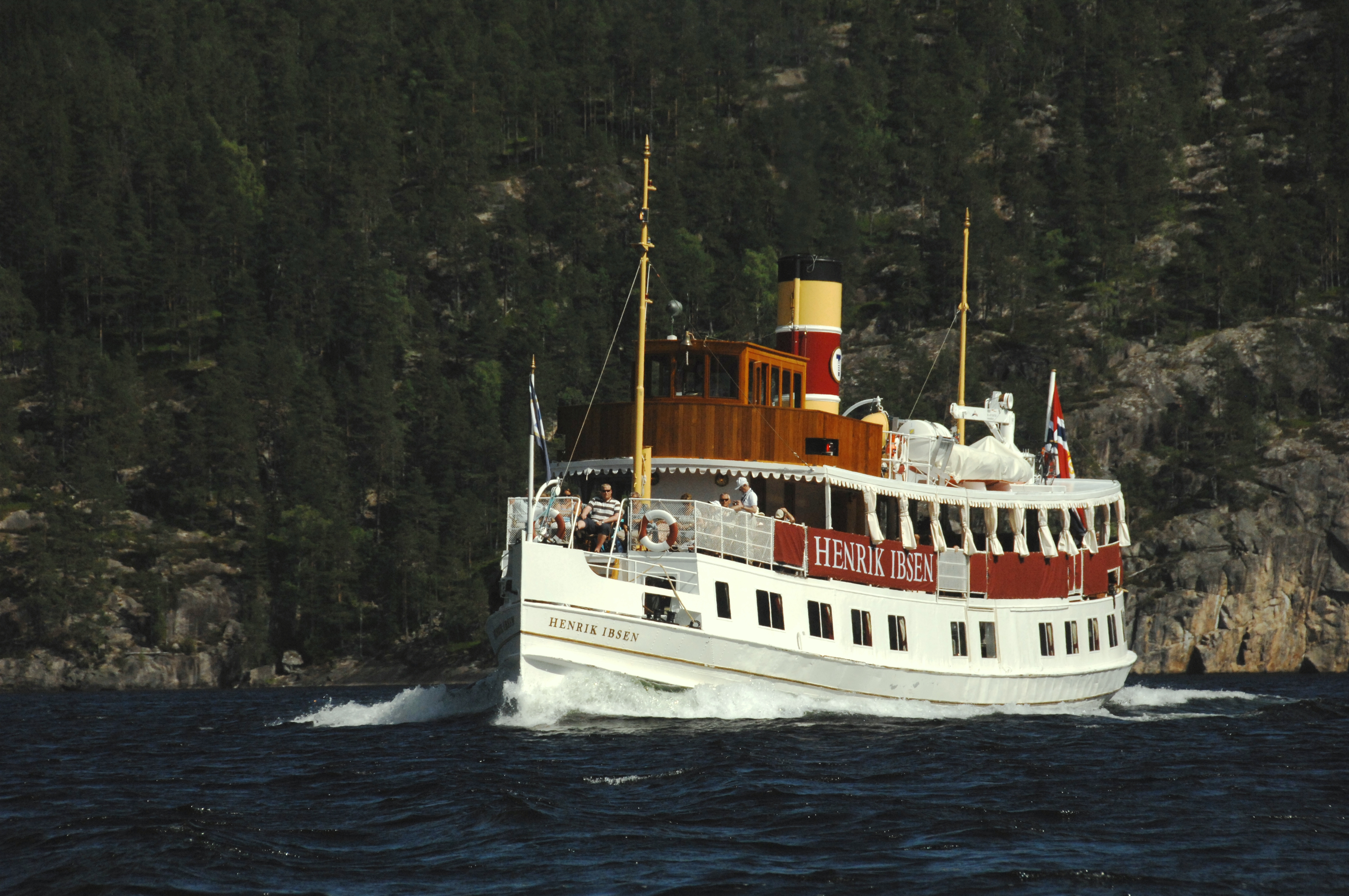
- MS Henrik Ibsen in June 2010

History

Sweden
- Name: D/S Styrsö
- Owner: Göteborgs Nya Ångslups AB, Göteborg (June 1907–1922); Styrsö Havsbad AB, Styrsö (1922–1928); Styrsö Nya Trafik AB, Styrsö (1928–1935); Styrsö Trafik AB, Göteborg (1935–1969); Göteborg-Styrsö Skärgårdstrafik AB, Göteborg, (1969–12 November 1992)
- Port of registry: Gotenburg, Sweden
- Builder: Eriksberg Mekaniske Verkstad, Gothenburg
- Yard number: 133
- Launched: June 1907
- In service: 1907
- Out of service: 1992
- Fate: Sold, 1992

Norway
- Name: Henrik Ibsen
- Namesake: Henrik Ibsen
- Owner: Turist Trafikk Dalen AS, Skien (12 November 1992–4 April 1999); Skien Dalen Skipsselskap AS, Skien (6 April 1999–8 February 2010); Telemarkskanalen Skipsselskap AS, Dalen (8 February 2010–present)
- Port of registry: Skien, Norway
- Refit: 2009
- Identification: IMO number: 5342673; Call sign: LGBH
- Status: in active service, as of 2021

General characteristics
- Tonnage: 186 GT
- Length: 30.91 m (101 ft 5 in) o/a; 29.26 m (96 ft 0 in) p/p
- Beam: 6.5 m (21 ft 4 in)
- Draught: 2.29 m (7 ft 6 in)
- Depth: 2.5 m (8 ft 2 in)
- Propulsion: Steam engine (1907); 1 × 360 hp (268 kW) Burmeister & Wain Alpha 406 FLO, 6-cylinder 2-stroke diesel engine (1952)
- Speed: 13 knots (24 km/h; 15 mph)
- Capacity: Passengers: 290 (to 1992); 220 (to 2008); 99 (from 2010)
- Crew: 3 to 6

MS Henrik Ibsen is a historic Norwegian diesel-powered ship built in 1907. Together with MS Victoria, it sails on the Telemark Canal in Norway between Skien and Dalen in the summer. The ship was built by Eriksbergs Mekaniska Verkstad in Gothenburg, Sweden in 1907 and named SS Styrsö. The ship was operated in the Gothenburg archipelago until 1970, and after that she was used as charter ship. It is named after Henrik Ibsen.

After being adapted to canal traffic, the ship arrived at Telemark Canal in 1992. She was renamed MS Henrik Ibsen after the former steamship SS Henrik Ibsen, which also operated on the Telemark Canal from 1907 to 1919. From 1999 until 2010 the ship was owned and operated by Skien Dalen Skipsselskap AS.

The ship was thereafter sold to the Telemarkskanalen Skipsselskap AS, owned by Thor Morten Halvorsen, who also owns Dalen Hotel. Upgrading of the ship was carried out at the Hansen & Arntzen shipyard in Stathelle and by boatbuilder Geir Røvik in Tønsberg. After a complete restoration new operations on the Telemark Canal began in mid-2010.
