= Åsgrend =

Village in Kviteseid Municipality, Norway

Åsgrend Åsgrendi
- Village
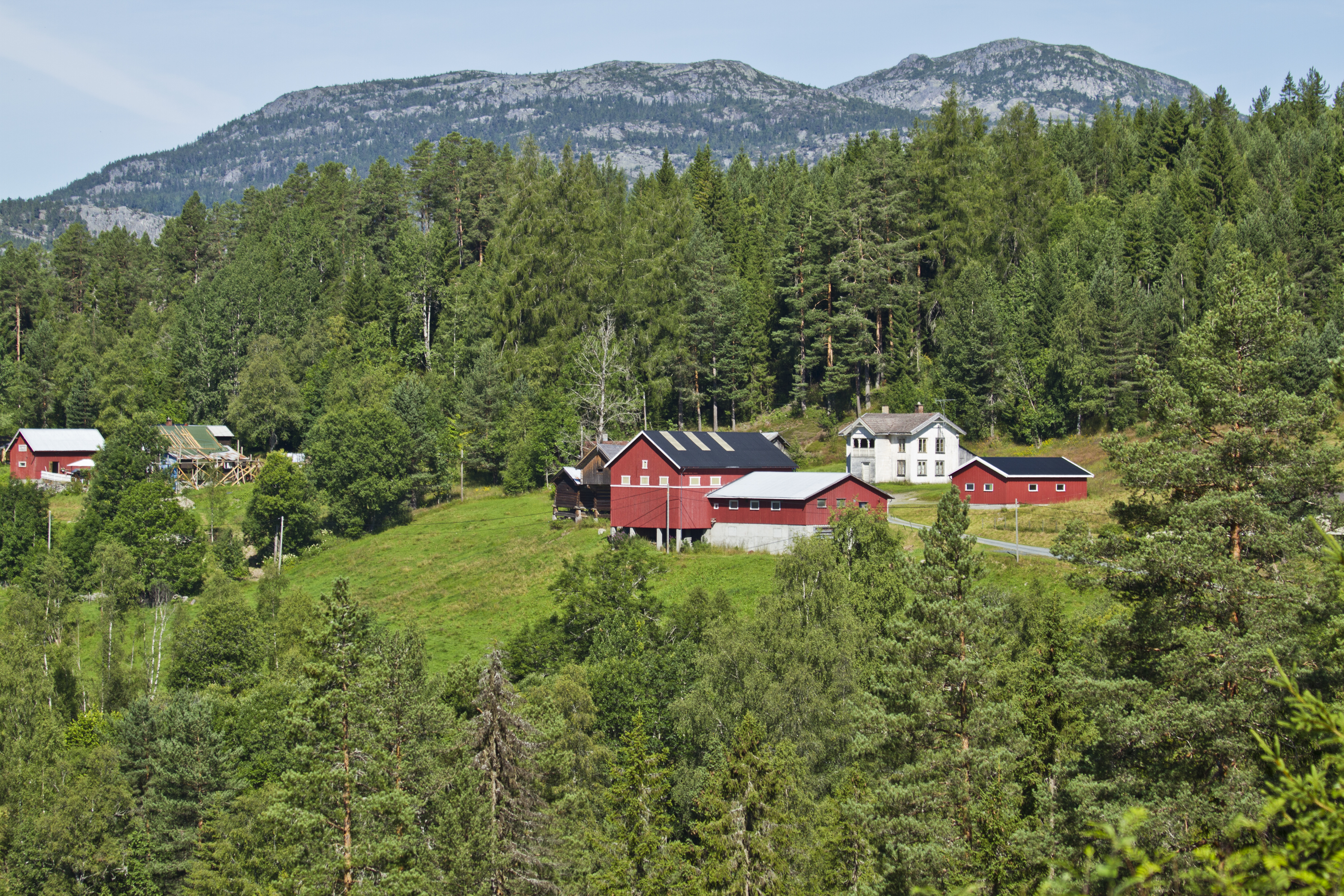
- View of the village area
- Interactive map of Åsgrend
- Coordinates: 59.44158°N 8.57417°E
- Country: Norway
- Region: Eastern Norway
- County: Telemark
- District: Vest-Telemark
- Municipality: Kviteseid Municipality
- Elevation: 350 m (1,150 ft)
- Time zone: UTC+01:00 (CET)
  - Summer (DST): UTC+02:00 (CEST)
- Post Code: 3850 Kviteseid

Åsgrend is a rural village in Kviteseid Municipality in Telemark county, Norway. The village is located in the northeastern part of the municipality, about 5 kilometres (3.1 mi) east of the village of Brunkeberg. The European route E134 highway passes just to the northwest of the village.

Åsgrend is a hilly and heavily forested area. There are several farms located in Åsgrend, including Heggtveit, Kolltveit, and Jelstad. As of 2017, there were 73 people living in Åsgrend.

In the summer, tourists come to the Åsgrend area particularly for hiking and fishing.
