= Knut Mevasstaul =

Norwegian artist (1785–1862)

Knut Olavson Mevasstaul (1785–1862) was a Norwegian rose painter (norsk rosemaler).

He was from Kviteseid in Telemark, Norway. He was trained in the decorative folk art of Rosemaling in the traditional style of Vest-Telemark in Upper Telemark. The Telemark style of decorative, ornamental painting is commonly asymmetrical with motives of leaves and blooming flowers that are varied and irregular. His festive, richly designed rococo vines and fine rolling marbling are found in a variety of room decorations in Telemark, including in Morgedal and Seljord. Many of his works have been retained, both complete painted rooms as well as smaller objects such as chests.

== Related reading ==
- Ellingsgard, Nils (1999) Norsk rosemåling – Dekorativ måling i folkekunsten (Oslo, Det norske samlaget) ISBN 82-521-5522-7
