= Kviteseid Municipality =

Municipality in Telemark, Norway

Kviteseid Municipality Kviteseid kommune
- Municipality
- Hviteseid herred (historic name)
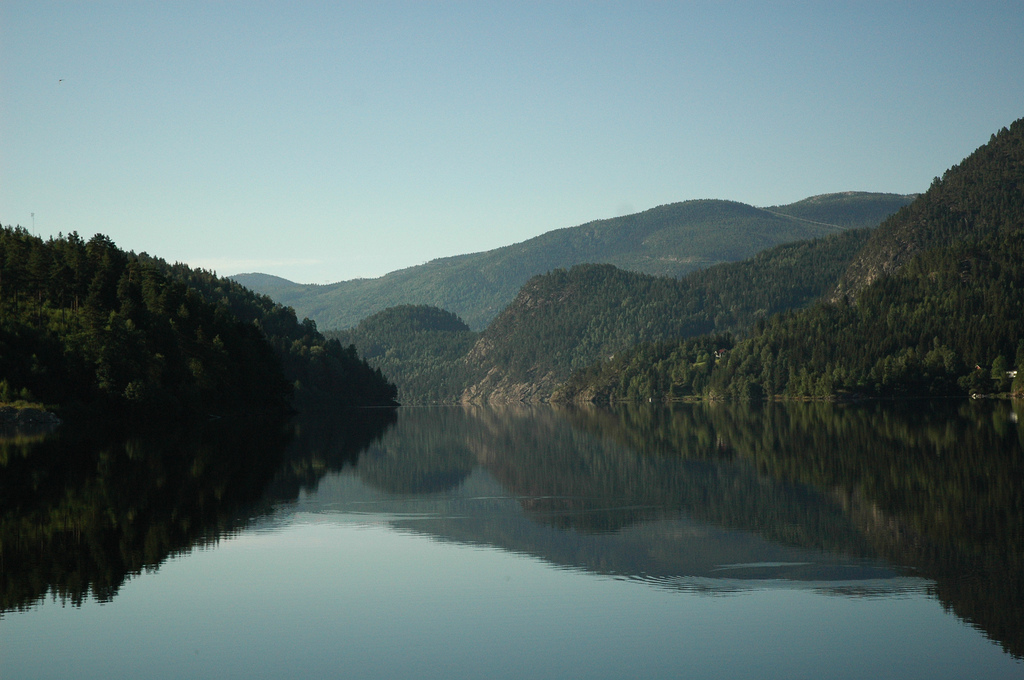

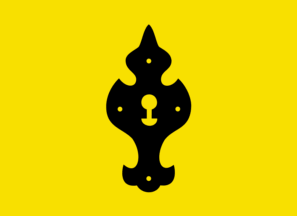
- Flag Coat of arms

- Telemark within Norway

- Kviteseid within Telemark
- Coordinates: 59°23′54″N 8°29′42″E
- Country: Norway
- County: Telemark
- District: Vest-Telemark
- Established: 1 Jan 1838
  - Created as: Formannskapsdistrikt
- Administrative centre: Kviteseid

Government
  - Mayor (2023): Tarjei Draugedal (KrF)

Area
  - Total: 708.47 km^{2} (273.54 sq mi)
  - Land: 623.05 km^{2} (240.56 sq mi)
  - Water: 85.42 km^{2} (32.98 sq mi) 12.1%
  - Rank: #163 in Norway
- Highest elevation: 1,140.56 m (3,742.0 ft)

Population (2026)
  - Total: 2,463
  - Rank: #258 in Norway
  - Density: 4/km^{2} (10/sq mi)
  - Change (10 years): ▲ +0.6%
- Demonym: Kvitseiding

Official language
  - Norwegian form: Nynorsk
- Time zone: UTC+01:00 (CET)
  - Summer (DST): UTC+02:00 (CEST)
- ISO 3166 code: NO-4028
- Website: Official website

Kviteseid (Norwegian pronunciation: [ˈkʋiːtəsæɪ̯]; locally [ˈkʋiːtsæɪ̯]) is a municipality in Telemark county, Norway. It is located in the traditional districts of Vest-Telemark and Upper Telemark. The administrative centre of the municipality is the village of Kviteseid. Other villages in Kviteseid include Åsgrend, Brunkeberg, Eidstod, Fjågesund, Kilen, Morgedal, and Vrådal.

The 708.47-square-kilometre (273.54 sq mi) municipality is the 163rd largest by area out of the 357 municipalities in Norway. Kviteseid Municipality is the 258th most populous municipality in Norway with a population of 2,463. The municipality's population density is 4 inhabitants per square kilometre (10/sq mi) and its population has increased by 0.6% over the previous 10-year period.

Kviteseid Seminar was the first public teacher training school in Norway which started in 1819 and was in operation until 1889. Kviteseid Library (Kviteseid Folkebibliotek) was founded in 1895. The library was first based on a book collection from Kviteseid Seminar. The main industries of the municipality include forestry, agriculture, tourism, and hydroelectric power. The Telemark Canal goes through the municipality.

There are also several ski resorts in Kviteseid as well. The little village of Morgedal is located in northern Kviteseid. It is known as the "Cradle of Modern Skiing" (Norwegian: Skisportens vugge) and the home of Sondre Norheim. Here, the Olympic Flame was lit for the 1952 Winter Olympics in Oslo, 1960 Winter Olympics in Squaw Valley, and 1994 Winter Olympics in Lillehammer.

== General information ==
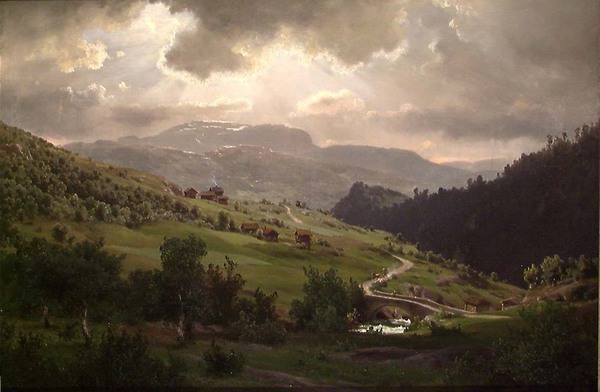
Painting of Kviteseid by Eckersberg in 1868

=== Administrative history ===
The formannskapsdistrikt law of 1837 created a system of local government in Norway by establishing each town (ladested or kjøpstad) and each Church of Norway prestegjeld as a civil municipality. On 1 January 1838, Hvideseid prestegjeld was established as Hvideseid Municipality (later spelled "Kviteseid"). On 11 October 1873, an unpopulated area of Kviteseid Munincipality was transferred to Seljord Municipality. The borders of the municipality have not changed since that time (which is pretty rare among municipalities in Norway).

In 2020, there were many municipal and county mergers across Norway due to the work of the Solberg cabinet. Historically, this municipality was part of Telemark county. On 1 January 2020, the municipality became a part of the newly-formed Vestfold og Telemark county (after Telemark and Vestfold counties were merged). The merger was shortlived, and on 1 January 2024, the merger was undone and this municipality became part of Telemark county once again.

=== Name ===
The municipality is named after the old Kviteseid prestegjeld. The prestegjeld was named after the old Kviteseid farm (Old Norse: Hvítingseið) since the Old Kviteseid Church was built there. The first element comes from the old name for the lake Kviteseidvatnet. That name is the plural genitive case of the word hvítr which means "white" or "the white one". The last element is eið which means "isthmus" or "path between two lakes". Prior to 1889, the name was spelled "Hviteseid". The spelling was changed to reflect the local dialect and spelling using Nynorsk rather than the more Danish-Bokmål spelling with the h.

=== Coat of arms ===
The coat of arms was granted on 27 November 1987. The official blazon is "Or, a lock plate sable" (Norwegian: På gull grunn eit svart låsskilt). This means the arms have a field (background) has a tincture of Or which means it is commonly colored yellow, but if it is made out of metal, then gold is used. The charge is a black lock plate. The lock design is based on one from the Tveitloftet medieval storehouse on the local Tveit farm dating back to the year 1350. The design symbolises the long traditions of lock-making and building construction in the area. The arms were designed by Daniel Rike. The municipal flag has the same design as the coat of arms.

=== Churches ===
The Church of Norway has one parish (sokn) within Kviteseid Municipality. It is part of the Øvre Telemark prosti (deanery) in the Diocese of Agder og Telemark.

Churches in Kviteseid Municipality
Parish (sokn)	Church name	Location of the church	Year built
Kviteseid	Brunkeberg Church	Brunkeberg	1790
Kviteseid	Fjågesund Church	Fjågesund	1916
Kviteseid	Kilen Chapel	Kilen	1958
Kviteseid	Kviteseid Church	Kviteseidbyen	1918
Kviteseid	Old Kviteseid Church	between Kviteseidbyen and Eidstod	c. 1260
Kviteseid	Vrådal Church	Vrådal	1886

== Geography ==
Seljord Municipality is located to the north and east, Nome Municipality is located to the east, Drangedal Municipality is located to the southeast, Nissedal Municipality is located to the south, Fyresdal Municipality is located to the southwest, and Tokke Municipality is located to the west.

There are several large lakes that are located in or partially in Kviteseid including Kviteseidvatnet, Flåvatn, and Bandak (all three of which are part of the Telemark Canal, plus Nisser and Vråvatn. The highest point in the municipality is the 1,140.56-metre (3,742.0 ft) tall mountain Sveinsheii, located on the border with Fyresdal Municipality.

== Government ==
Kviteseid Municipality is responsible for primary education (through 10th grade), outpatient health services, senior citizen services, welfare and other social services, zoning, economic development, and municipal roads and utilities. The municipality is governed by a municipal council of directly elected representatives. The mayor is indirectly elected by a vote of the municipal council. The municipality is under the jurisdiction of the Øvre Telemark District Court and the Agder Court of Appeal.

=== Municipal council ===
The municipal council (Kommunestyre) of Kviteseid Municipality is made up of 17 representatives that are elected to four-year terms. The tables below show the current and historical composition of the council by political party.

Kviteseid kommunestyre 2023–2027
Party name (in Nynorsk)	Number of representatives
Labour Party (Arbeidarpartiet)	5
Conservative Party (Høgre)	2
Christian Democratic Party (Kristeleg Folkeparti)	5
Centre Party (Senterpartiet)	4
Liberal Party (Venstre)	1
Total number of members:	17

Kviteseid kommunestyre 2019–2023
Party name (in Nynorsk)	Number of representatives
Labour Party (Arbeidarpartiet)	6
Green Party (Miljøpartiet Dei Grøne)	1
Conservative Party (Høgre)	2
Christian Democratic Party (Kristeleg Folkeparti)	2
Centre Party (Senterpartiet)	6
Total number of members:	17

Kviteseid kommunestyre 2015–2019
Party name (in Nynorsk)	Number of representatives
Labour Party (Arbeidarpartiet)	9
Green Party (Miljøpartiet Dei Grøne)	1
Conservative Party (Høgre)	2
Christian Democratic Party (Kristeleg Folkeparti)	3
Centre Party (Senterpartiet)	5
Liberal Party (Venstre)	1
Total number of members:	21

Kviteseid kommunestyre 2011–2015
Party name (in Nynorsk)	Number of representatives
Labour Party (Arbeidarpartiet)	7
Conservative Party (Høgre)	3
Christian Democratic Party (Kristeleg Folkeparti)	2
Centre Party (Senterpartiet)	7
Liberal Party (Venstre)	2
Total number of members:	21

Kviteseid kommunestyre 2007–2011
Party name (in Nynorsk)	Number of representatives
Labour Party (Arbeidarpartiet)	6
Conservative Party (Høgre)	2
Christian Democratic Party (Kristeleg Folkeparti)	3
Centre Party (Senterpartiet)	8
Liberal Party (Venstre)	2
Total number of members:	21

Kviteseid kommunestyre 2003–2007
Party name (in Nynorsk)	Number of representatives
Labour Party (Arbeidarpartiet)	7
Conservative Party (Høgre)	2
Christian Democratic Party (Kristeleg Folkeparti)	3
Centre Party (Senterpartiet)	8
Liberal Party (Venstre)	1
Total number of members:	21

Kviteseid kommunestyre 1999–2003
Party name (in Nynorsk)	Number of representatives
Labour Party (Arbeidarpartiet)	10
Conservative Party (Høgre)	3
Christian Democratic Party (Kristeleg Folkeparti)	4
Centre Party (Senterpartiet)	7
Liberal Party (Venstre)	1
Total number of members:	25

Kviteseid kommunestyre 1995–1999
Party name (in Nynorsk)	Number of representatives
Labour Party (Arbeidarpartiet)	7
Conservative Party (Høgre)	2
Christian Democratic Party (Kristeleg Folkeparti)	3
Centre Party (Senterpartiet)	12
Liberal Party (Venstre)	1
Total number of members:	25

Kviteseid kommunestyre 1991–1995
Party name (in Nynorsk)	Number of representatives
Labour Party (Arbeidarpartiet)	9
Conservative Party (Høgre)	2
Christian Democratic Party (Kristeleg Folkeparti)	3
Centre Party (Senterpartiet)	8
Socialist Left Party (Sosialistisk Venstreparti)	2
Liberal Party (Venstre)	1
Total number of members:	25

Kviteseid kommunestyre 1987–1991
Party name (in Nynorsk)	Number of representatives
Labour Party (Arbeidarpartiet)	12
Conservative Party (Høgre)	3
Christian Democratic Party (Kristeleg Folkeparti)	4
Centre Party (Senterpartiet)	4
Socialist Left Party (Sosialistisk Venstreparti)	1
Liberal Party (Venstre)	1
Total number of members:	25

Kviteseid kommunestyre 1983–1987
Party name (in Nynorsk)	Number of representatives
Labour Party (Arbeidarpartiet)	12
Conservative Party (Høgre)	3
Christian Democratic Party (Kristeleg Folkeparti)	4
Centre Party (Senterpartiet)	4
Socialist Left Party (Sosialistisk Venstreparti)	1
Liberal Party (Venstre)	1
Total number of members:	25

Kviteseid kommunestyre 1979–1983
Party name (in Nynorsk)	Number of representatives
Labour Party (Arbeidarpartiet)	11
Conservative Party (Høgre)	4
Christian Democratic Party (Kristeleg Folkeparti)	4
Joint list of the Centre Party (Senterpartiet) and the Liberal Party (Venstre)	6
Total number of members:	25

Kviteseid kommunestyre 1975–1979
Party name (in Nynorsk)	Number of representatives
Labour Party (Arbeidarpartiet)	11
Christian Democratic Party (Kristeleg Folkeparti)	5
Socialist Left Party (Sosialistisk Venstreparti)	1
Joint list of the Conservative Party (Høgre), Centre Party (Senterpartiet), and Liberal Party (Venstre)	8
Total number of members:	25

Kviteseid kommunestyre 1971–1975
Party name (in Nynorsk)	Number of representatives
Labour Party (Arbeidarpartiet)	14
Christian Democratic Party (Kristeleg Folkeparti)	4
Centre Party (Senterpartiet)	5
Liberal Party (Venstre)	2
Total number of members:	25

Kviteseid kommunestyre 1967–1971
Party name (in Nynorsk)	Number of representatives
Labour Party (Arbeidarpartiet)	14
Conservative Party (Høgre)	1
Christian Democratic Party (Kristeleg Folkeparti)	3
Centre Party (Senterpartiet)	5
Liberal Party (Venstre)	2
Total number of members:	25

Kviteseid kommunestyre 1963–1967
Party name (in Nynorsk)	Number of representatives
Labour Party (Arbeidarpartiet)	14
Conservative Party (Høgre)	1
Christian Democratic Party (Kristeleg Folkeparti)	2
Centre Party (Senterpartiet)	5
Liberal Party (Venstre)	3
Total number of members:	25

Kviteseid heradsstyre 1959–1963
Party name (in Nynorsk)	Number of representatives
Labour Party (Arbeidarpartiet)	14
Christian Democratic Party (Kristeleg Folkeparti)	2
Centre Party (Senterpartiet)	6
Liberal Party (Venstre)	3
Total number of members:	25

Kviteseid heradsstyre 1955–1959
Party name (in Nynorsk)	Number of representatives
Labour Party (Arbeidarpartiet)	13
Joint List(s) of Non-Socialist Parties (Borgarlege Felleslister)	12
Total number of members:	25

Kviteseid heradsstyre 1951–1955
Party name (in Nynorsk)	Number of representatives
Labour Party (Arbeidarpartiet)	13
Joint List(s) of Non-Socialist Parties (Borgarlege Felleslister)	11
Total number of members:	24

Kviteseid heradsstyre 1947–1951
Party name (in Nynorsk)	Number of representatives
Labour Party (Arbeidarpartiet)	13
Joint List(s) of Non-Socialist Parties (Borgarlege Felleslister)	6
Local List(s) (Lokale lister)	5
Total number of members:	24

Kviteseid heradsstyre 1945–1947
Party name (in Nynorsk)	Number of representatives
Labour Party (Arbeidarpartiet)	12
Communist Party (Kommunistiske Parti)	2
Joint list of the Liberal Party (Venstre) and the Radical People's Party (Radikale Folkepartiet)	2
Joint List(s) of Non-Socialist Parties (Borgarlege Felleslister)	8
Total number of members:	24

Kviteseid heradsstyre 1937–1941*
Party name (in Nynorsk)	Number of representatives
Labour Party (Arbeidarpartiet)	13
Joint List(s) of Non-Socialist Parties (Borgarlege Felleslister)	9
Local List(s) (Lokale lister)	2
Total number of members:	24
Note: Due to the German occupation of Norway during World War II, no elections were held for new municipal councils until after the war ended in 1945.

=== Mayors ===
The mayor (Nynorsk: ordførar) of Kviteseid Municipality is the political leader of the municipality and the chairperson of the municipal council. The following people have held this position:

- 1838–1841: Ole Blom
- 1842–1843: Ole Bjørnsen Haukom
- 1844–1861: Tormod Knudsen Borgejorde
- 1862–1879: Knut Taraldsen
- 1880–1883: Bjørn Brekke
- 1884–1890: Knut Taraldsen
- 1890–1900: Ludvig Kristoffersen
- 1901–1913: Sigurd Torleivson Kolltveit (V)
- 1914–1919: Halvor Straand
- 1920–1922: Sigurd Kolltveit
- 1923–1924: Knut Skarprud
- 1925–1928: Halvor Straand
- 1929–1932: Olaf Hegland (V)
- 1932–1933: Torleiv Kolltveit
- 1934–1941: Sigurd Rinden (Ap)
- 1941–1945: Håkon Eikland (NS)
- 1945–1946: Sigurd Rinden (Ap)
- 1946–1947: Knut Nørstrud (Ap)
- 1948–1951: Trygve Bergland
- 1952–1967: Svein Landsverk (Ap)
- 1968–1970: Sigurd Rinden (Ap)
- 1970–1975: Øystein Strondi (Ap)
- 1976–1979: Arne Bjørnson (Sp)
- 1980–1983: Nils Sandvik (Sp)
- 1984–1991: Johannes Skarprud (Ap)
- 1992–1998: Inge Fjalestad (Sp)
- 1998–1999: Anne Lise Råmunddal (Sp)
- 1999–2003: Karin Maria Larsen (Ap)
- 2003–2015: Torstein Tveito (Sp)
- 2015–2019: Tarjei Gjelstad (Ap)
- 2019–2023: Bjørn Nordskog (Sp)
- 2023–present: Tarjei Draugedal (KrF)

== Notable people ==
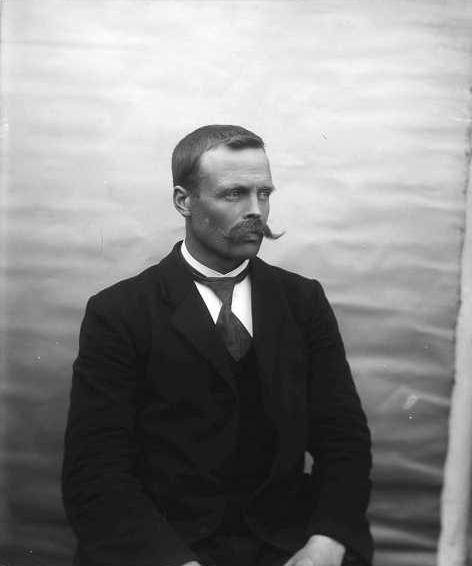
Olav Bjaaland, 1910

- Peter Paulson Paus (1590 - 1653 in Kviteseid), a high-ranking cleric and provost of Upper Telemark from 1633-1653
- Knut Mevasstaul (1785 in Kviteseid – 1862), a painter specializing in rosemåling
- Sondre Norheim (1825 in Morgedal – 1897), a pioneer skier and father of Telemark skiing
- brothers Torjus Hemmestveit (1860–1930) and Mikkjel Hemmestveit (1863–1957) born in Morgedal, two Norwegian-American Nordic skiers who shared the Holmenkollen medal in 1928
- Olav Bjaaland (1873 in Morgedal – 1961), a skiing champion and polar explorer who was one of the five men to reach the South Pole as part of Amundsen's South Pole expedition in 1911
- Einar Landvik (1898 in Kviteseid – 1993), a Nordic skier who competed in 1924 Winter Olympics
- Dyre Vaa (1903 in Kviteseid – 1980), a sculptor and painter
- Solveig Muren Sanden (1918 in Vrådal – 2013), an illustrator and comics artist
