= Vrådal =

Village in Kviteseid Municipality, Norway

Vrådal Wraadahl
- Village area
- Interactive map of Vrådal
- Coordinates: 59.32601°N 8.4848°E
- Country: Norway
- Region: Eastern Norway
- County: Telemark
- District: Vest-Telemark
- Municipality: Kviteseid Municipality

Area
  - Total: 0.84 km^{2} (0.32 sq mi)
- Elevation: 254 m (833 ft)

Population (2012)
  - Total: 215
  - Density: 256/km^{2} (660/sq mi)
- Time zone: UTC+01:00 (CET)
  - Summer (DST): UTC+02:00 (CEST)
- Post Code: 3853 Vrådal

Vrådal (historically spelled Wraadahl) is a village area in Kviteseid Municipality in Telemark county, Norway. The village is located along the northern end of the lake Nisser and the eastern end of the lake Vråvatn. The economy is based on tourism (hotels, camping and a ski-centre), light industry, and small-scale logging. The wooden Vrådal Church, built in 1866, is located on the western end of the village. The urban core of Vrådal is called Eidstod. Vrådal is located about 10 kilometres (6.2 mi) to the south of the village of Kviteseid.

The 0.84-square-kilometre (210-acre) village had a population (2012) of 215 and a population density of 256 inhabitants per square kilometre (660/sq mi). Since 2000, the population and area data for this village area has not been separately tracked by Statistics Norway.

== Name ==
The village area is named Vrådal (Old Norse: Ródalr). The first element is named after the old Vraa farm (Old Norse: Ró) since the first Vrådal Church was built there. The farm name is derived from the word rá which means "corner" or "step". The last element is dalr which means "valley" or "dale". The name could be referring to the fact that the valley is angled like a corner.
