= Kviteseidvatnet =

Lake in Telemark, Norway

- Kviteseidvatn
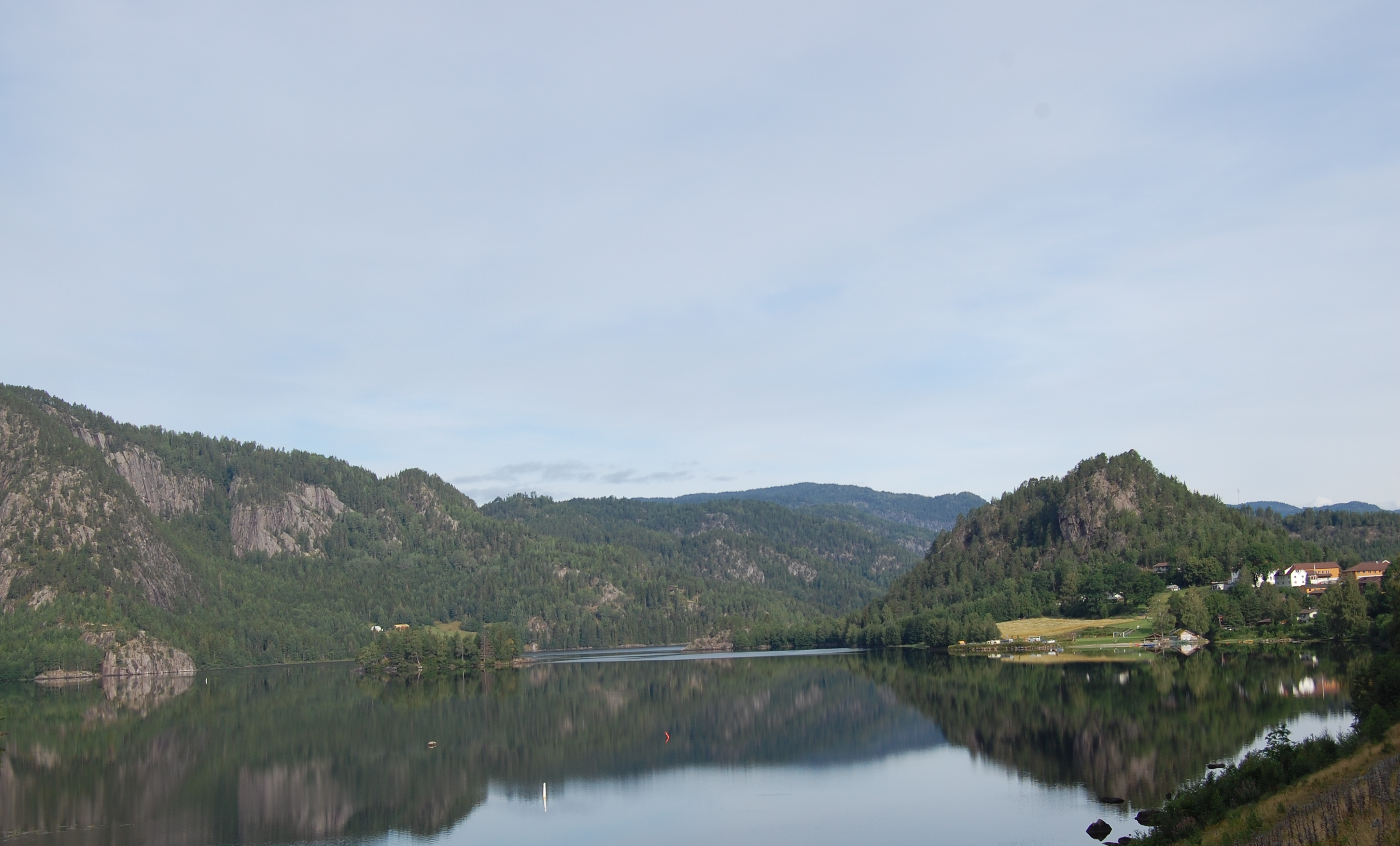
- Interactive map of Kviteseidvatnet
- Location: Kviteseid Municipality, Telemark
- Coordinates: 59.35246°N 8.56907°E
- Type: glacial lake
- Primary inflows: Bandak lake
- Primary outflows: Flåvatn lake
- Catchment area: 2,983.51 km^{2} (1,151.94 sq mi)
- Basin countries: Norway
- Max. length: 11 km (6.8 mi)
- Max. width: 2.3 km (1.4 mi)
- Surface area: 15.76 km^{2} (6.08 sq mi)
- Average depth: 93 m (305 ft)
- Max. depth: 201 m (659 ft)
- Water volume: 1.47 km^{3} (0.35 cu mi)
- Shore length^{1}: 26.9 km (16.7 mi)
- Surface elevation: 72 m (236 ft)
- Islands: Bukkøy
- References: NVE
- ^{1} Shore length is not a well-defined measure.

Kviteseidvatnet is a lake in Kviteseid Municipality in Telemark county, Norway. The 15.76-square-kilometre (6.08 sq mi) lake is part of the Telemark Canal and lies in the Skien watershed. The lake's water level was first regulated in 1892.

Kviteseidvatn's inlet is via a stream called Strauman from the lake Bandak, and it discharges via a different stream named Straumen into the lake Flåvatn.

The Norwegian National Road 41 runs along the western end of the lake. The Old Kviteseid Church is located at the southwestern end of the lake.

== See also ==
- List of lakes in Norway
