= Telemark Canal =

Canal in Telemark, Norway

Coordinates: 59°17′N 9°16′E

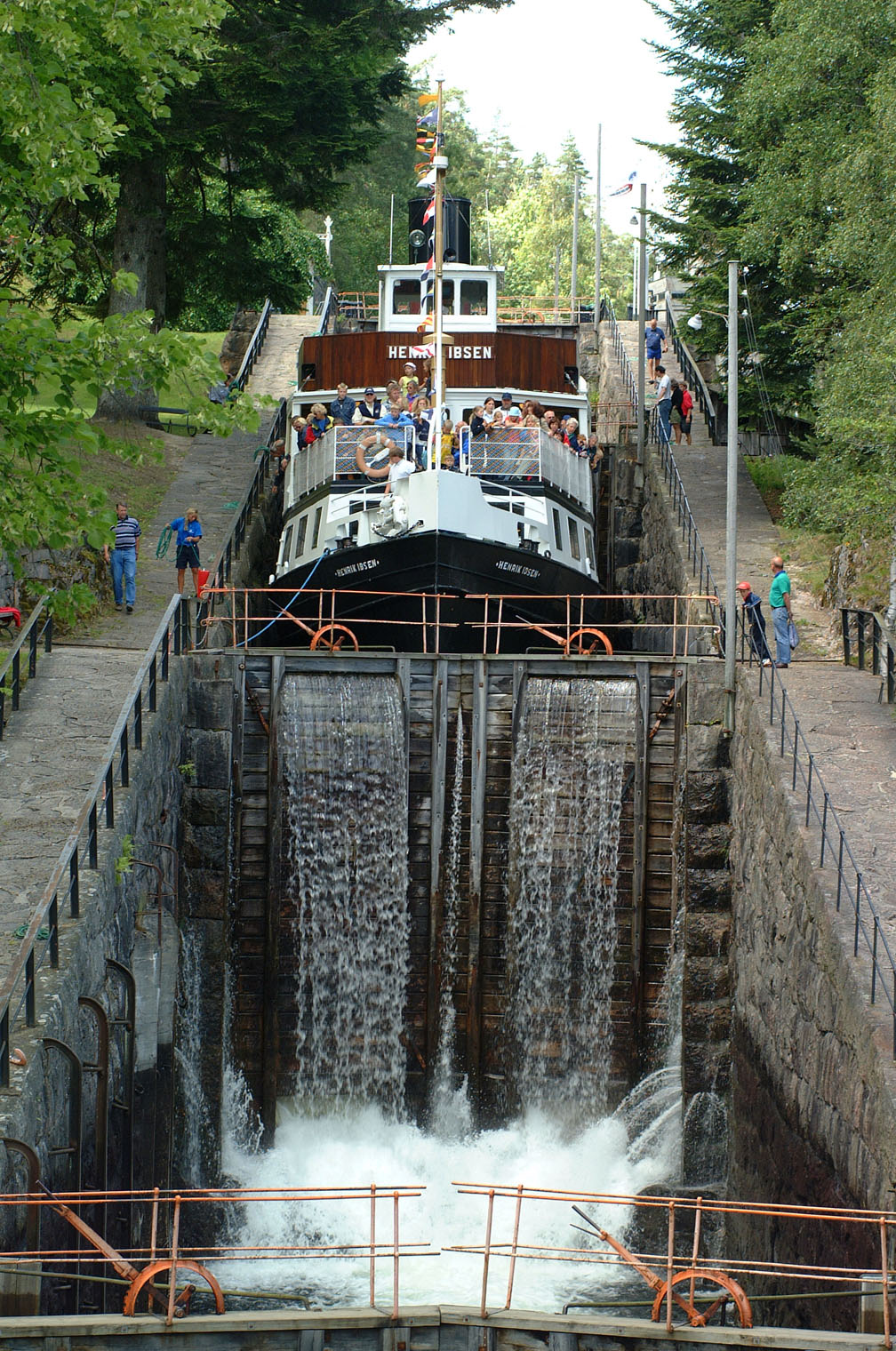
- The Henrik Ibsen in a lock at Vrangfoss staircase locks

Physical characteristics
- Source
  - elevation: 72 m (236 ft)
- Length: 105 km (65 mi)

The Telemark Canal connects the towns Skien and Dalen in Telemark county in southern Norway by linking several long lakes in the Skien watershed through a series of 18 locks.

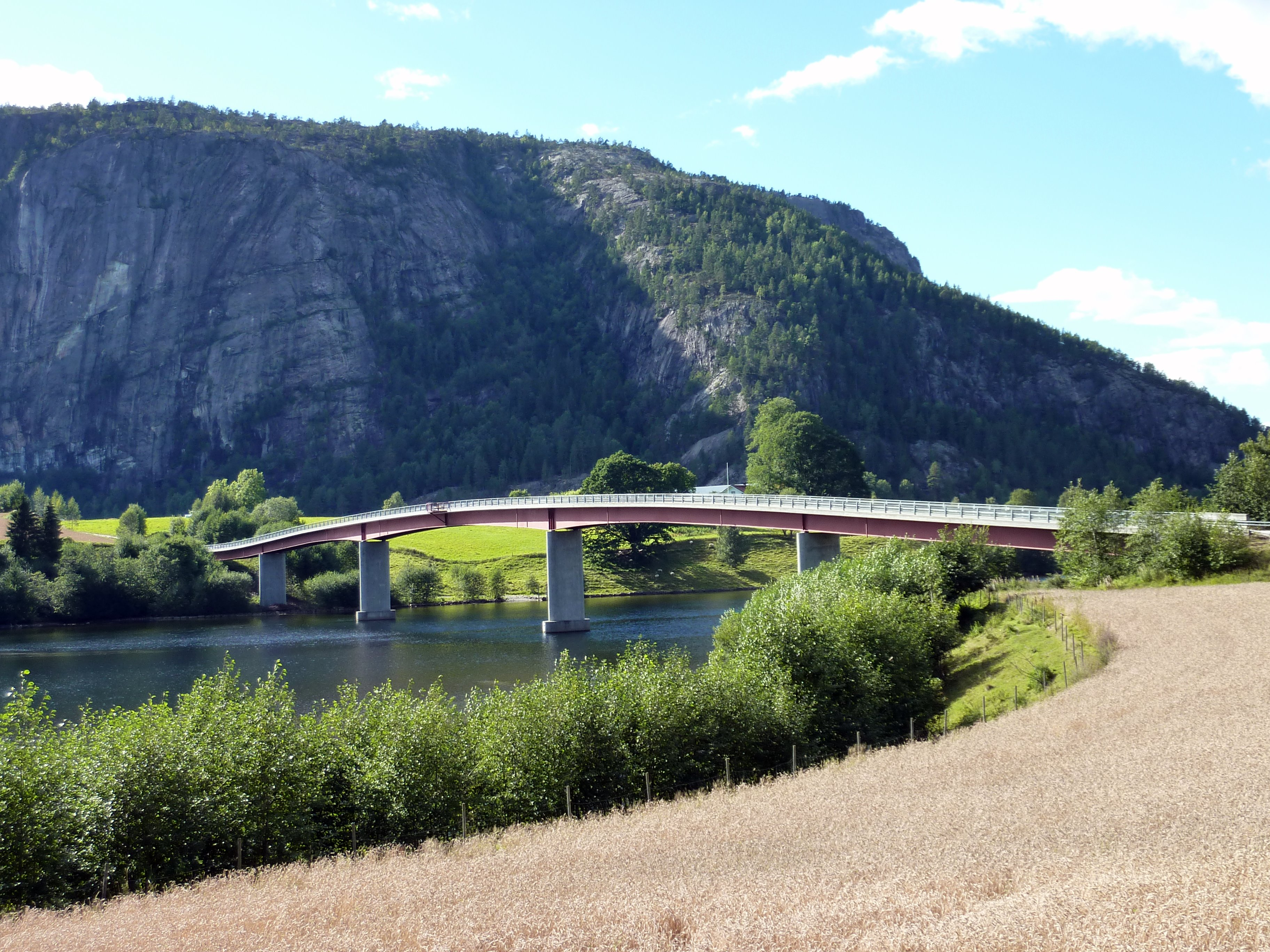
Fjågesund Bridge over the Telemark Canal

It originally consisted of two canals. The Norsjø–Skien Canal, with locks in Skien and Løveid, was built in 1854–1861 and linked Skien with Norsjø lake. The longer Bandak–Norsjø Canal was opened in 1892 by the Minister of Labour Hans Hein Theodor Nysom. It extended the canal from Norsjø lake through Flåvatn and Kviteseidvatn (Kviteseidvatnet) lakes to Bandak Lake. In Europe, this canal was seen as "the eighth wonder" at the time it was finished. The Bandak–Nordsjø Canal was mainly built for transport of goods and passengers, log floating and to prevent flooding. Log floating is no longer practiced, due to the closing of Union, a local paper factory. An eastern section gives access from Norsjø lake to Notodden via Lake Heddalsvatnet.

The Telemark Canal consists of 18 locks, is 105 kilometres (65 mi) long and has a total difference in elevation of 72 metres (236 ft). The biggest staircase lock is Vrangfoss, which has five chambers and a lifting height of 23 metres (75 ft). The riverboats Henrik Ibsen and Victoria travel with tourists from Skien to Dalen via Kviteseid. Victoria has traveled the Norsjø–Skien Canal since 1882, and the Bandak–Norsjø Canal since its opening.

The canal was selected as the millennium site for Telemark County. It was also features in the Telemarkskanalen – minutt for minutt slow television documentary in 2012.

The Bandak-Norsjø Canal was made a National Cultural Heritage in June 2017.

== List of lock chambers ==
There are 18 lock chambers at 8 different locations.

Lock	Lift height	Chambers	Lock passage time
Skien	5 m	1	20 min
Løveid	10.3 m	3	35 min
Ulefoss	10.7 m	3	40 min
Eidsfoss	10 m	2	30 min
Vrangfoss	23 m	5	60 min
Lunde	3 m	1	15 min
Kjeldal	3 m	1	15 min
Hogga	7 m	2	25 min

== Maximum traffic dimensions ==
Dimension	Meter	Feet	Remarks
Mast height	16	52.5	Limited to 12.8 m at Ulefoss–Dalen
Length	31.4	100	
Width	6.6	21	
Draft	2.5	8	

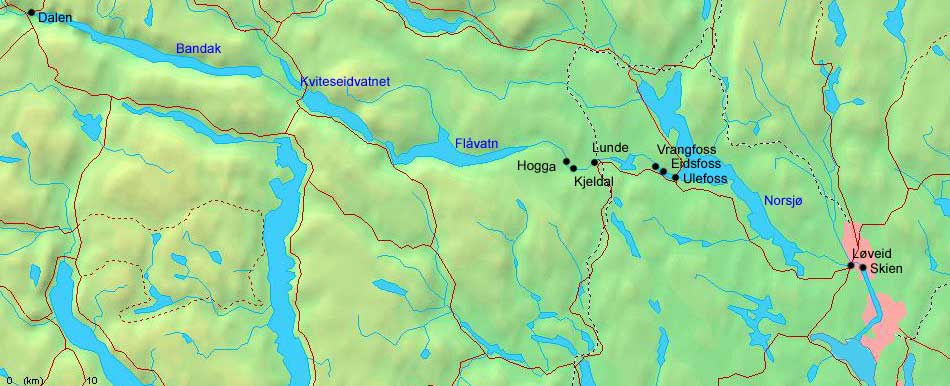
Telemark Canal from Skien to Dalen. The canal to Heddalsvatnet is not shown, but connects the north end of Norsjø.
