= Flåvatn =

Lake in Telemark, Norway

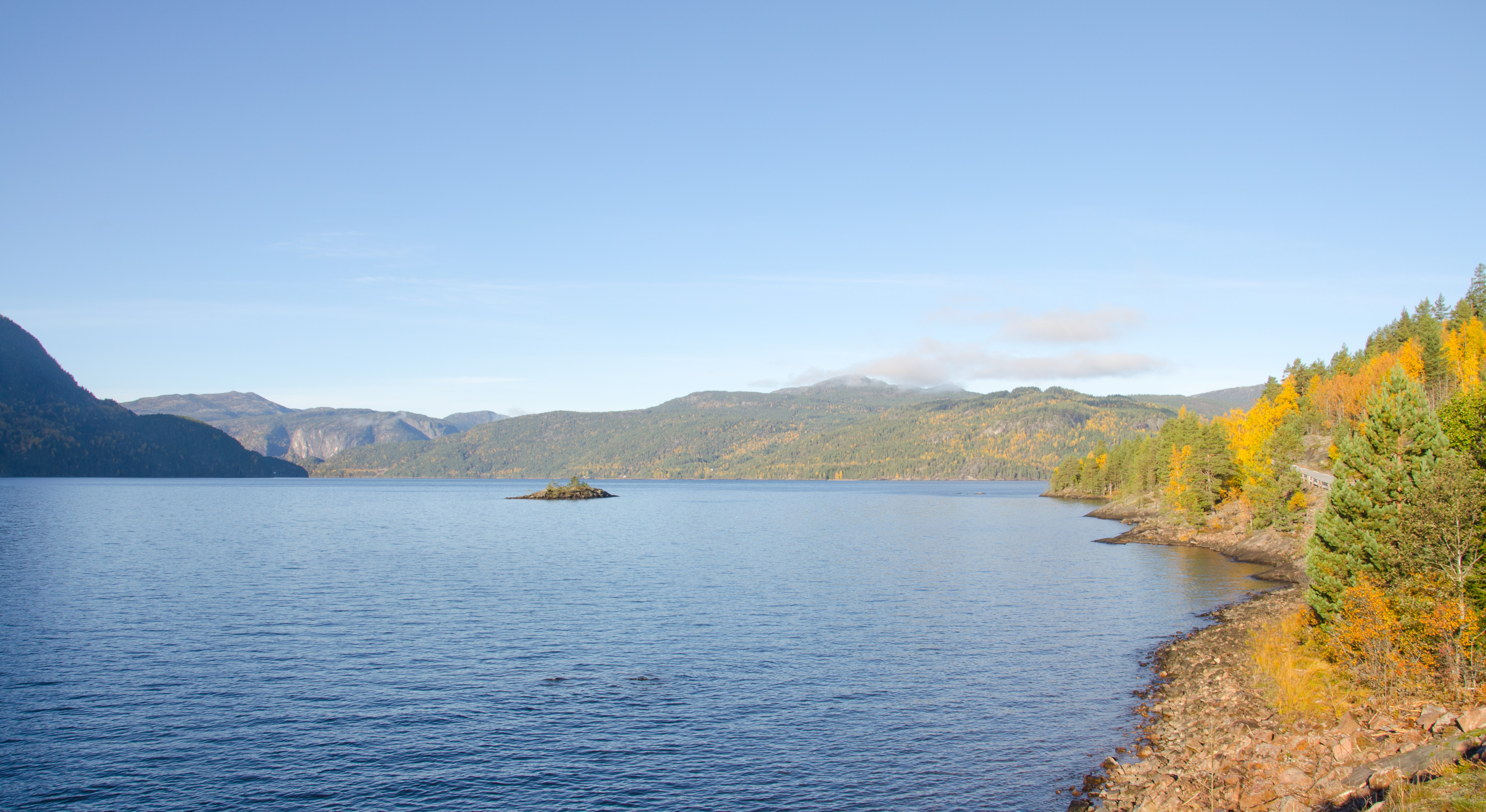
- Interactive map of Flåvatn
- Location: Kviteseid and Nome, Telemark
- Coordinates: 59.30844°N 8.80441°E
- Type: glacial lake
- Primary inflows: Kviteseidvatn lake
- Primary outflows: Straumen river
- Catchment area: 3,250.56 km^{2} (1,255.05 sq mi)
- Basin countries: Norway
- Max. length: 15 km (9.3 mi)
- Max. width: 3.3 km (2.1 mi)
- Surface area: 19.52 km^{2} (7.54 sq mi)
- Average depth: 67.5 m (221 ft)
- Max. depth: 152 m (499 ft)
- Water volume: 1.32 km^{3} (0.32 cu mi)
- Shore length^{1}: 43.8 km (27.2 mi)
- Surface elevation: 72 m (236 ft)
- References: NVE
- ^{1} Shore length is not a well-defined measure.

Flåvatn is a lake in Nome Municipality and Kviteseid Municipality in Telemark county, Norway. The lake is the easternmost of the three connected lakes Bandak, Kviteseidvatnet, and Flåvatn, which are all part of the Telemark Canal. The lake's area is 19.52 square kilometres (7.54 sq mi). The outlet is via the river Straumen (also known as Eidselva) which flows down to the lake Norsjø.

The village of Kilen lies along the northern shore of the lake and the village of Flåbygd lies at the eastern end of the lake.

== See also ==
- List of lakes in Norway
