= Kilen, Telemark =

Village in Kviteseid Municipality, Norway

Kilen
- Village
- Interactive map of Kilen
- Coordinates: 59.34126°N 8.78998°E
- Country: Norway
- Region: Eastern Norway
- County: Telemark
- District: Vest-Telemark
- Municipality: Kviteseid Municipality
- Elevation: 88 m (289 ft)
- Time zone: UTC+01:00 (CET)
  - Summer (DST): UTC+02:00 (CEST)
- Post Code: 3840 Seljord

Kilen is a village in Kviteseid Municipality in Telemark county, Norway. The village is located on a small bay on the north side of the large lake Flåvatn. It is located about 20 kilometres (12 mi) to the southeast of Kviteseidbyen and about 20 kilometres (12 mi) to the south of the village of Seljord.
