= Kviteseid (village) =

Village in Kviteseid Municipality, Norway

Kviteseid Kviteseidbyen (unofficial)
- Village
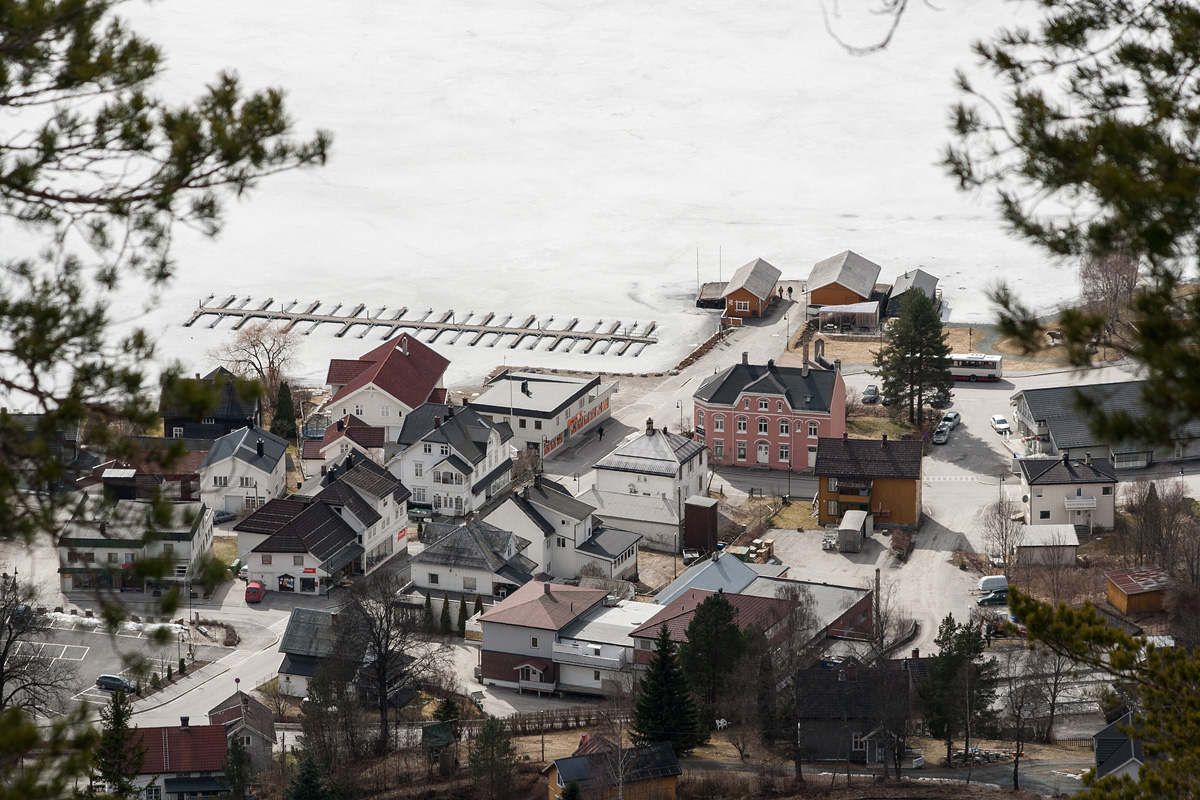
- View of the village harbour
- Interactive map of Kviteseid
- Coordinates: 59.40224°N 8.49268°E
- Country: Norway
- Region: Eastern Norway
- County: Telemark
- District: Vest-Telemark
- Municipality: Kviteseid Municipality

Area
  - Total: 1.37 km^{2} (0.53 sq mi)
- Elevation: 84 m (276 ft)

Population (2025)
  - Total: 811
  - Density: 592/km^{2} (1,530/sq mi)
- Time zone: UTC+01:00 (CET)
  - Summer (DST): UTC+02:00 (CEST)
- Post Code: 3850 Kviteseid

Kviteseid is the administrative centre of Kviteseid Municipality in Telemark county, Norway. The village is located at the north end of the Sundkilen lake, an extension off of the main Kviteseidvatnet lake. The village of Brunkeberg lies about 5 kilometres (3.1 mi) to the north, the village of Vrådal lies about 10 kilometres (6.2 mi) to the south, and the village of Fjågesund lies about 20 kilometres (12 mi) to the southeast.

The 1.37-square-kilometre (340-acre) village has a population (2025) of 811 and a population density of 592 inhabitants per square kilometre (1,530/sq mi).

The Norwegian National Road 41 runs along the east side of the village. The village is also a boat stop along the Telemark Canal.

== History ==
Kviteseid began as a village in 1890 when the Telemark Canal opened and this site became a stopping point for the boat traffic on the canal. Prior to that, there were no urban settlements in Kviteseid. The small village grew up around the harbour due to the increased traffic in people and goods moving along the waterway. The village served as a traffic hub for a large part of the Vest-Telemark region. Soon several hotels, shuttle stations, and buildings were constructed. Craftsmen and other businesses opened up shops as well. In 1916, the "new" Kviteseid Church was built in the village to replace the Old Kviteseid Church which is located about 6 kilometres (3.7 mi) to the south. Prior to the village's establishment, the site of the old church was the main gathering place for the municipality.

Kviteseid has a long tradition in butter production. The first dairy in the village came into operation in the early 1890s, and Kviteseid became known for its good butter. Early in the 20th century, the farmers in Kviteseid established their own cooperative dairy: Kviteseid Dairy. The dairy produced cheese, butter, and drinking milk.
