= Lunde Municipality (Telemark) =

Former municipality in Telemark, Norway

Lunde Municipality Lunde herad
- Former municipality
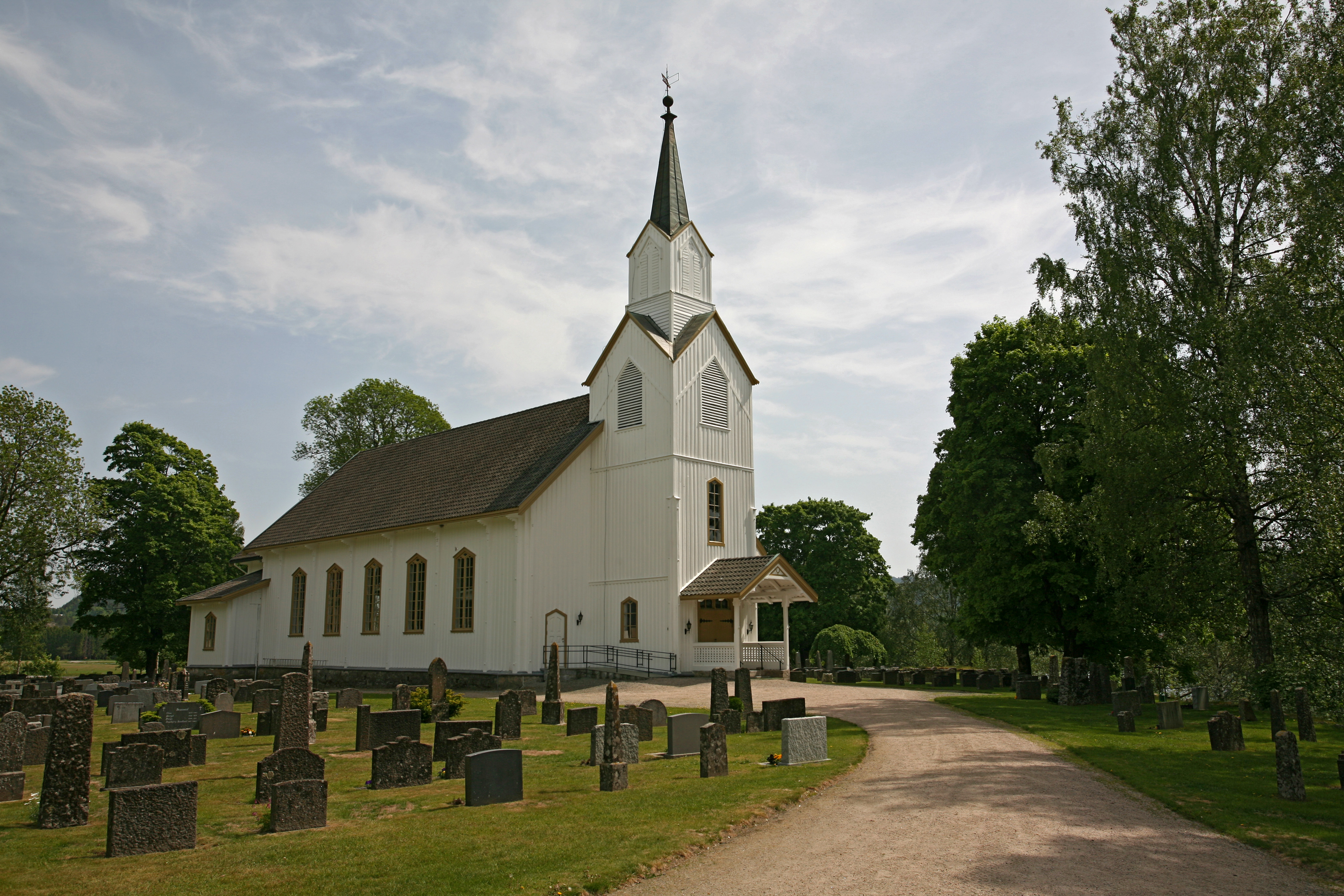
- View of the local church

- Telemark within Norway

- Lunde within Telemark
- Coordinates: 59°17′54″N 9°06′10″E
- Country: Norway
- County: Telemark
- District: Midt-Telemark
- Established: 1 Jan 1867
  - Preceded by: Bø Municipality
- Disestablished: 1 Jan 1964
  - Succeeded by: Nome Municipality
- Administrative centre: Bjervamoen

Government
  - Mayor (1959–1963): Torstein Børte (V)

Area (upon dissolution)
  - Total: 274.5 km^{2} (106.0 sq mi)
  - Rank: #300 in Norway
- Highest elevation (Knarren): 749.45 m (2,458.8 ft)

Population (1963)
  - Total: 3,066
  - Rank: #300 in Norway
  - Density: 11.2/km^{2} (29/sq mi)
  - Change (10 years): ▼ −2.5%
- Demonym: Lundhering

Official language
  - Norwegian form: Nynorsk
- Time zone: UTC+01:00 (CET)
  - Summer (DST): UTC+02:00 (CEST)
- ISO 3166 code: NO-0820

Lunde (Norwegian pronunciation: [²lʉn.də]; locally [ˈɽʉ̂nːe]) is a former municipality in Telemark county, Norway. The 274.5-square-kilometre (106.0 sq mi) municipality existed from 1867 until its dissolution in 1964. The area is now part of Nome Municipality in the traditional district of Midt-Telemark. The administrative centre was the village of Bjervamoen.

Prior to its dissolution in 1964, the 274.5-square-kilometre (106.0 sq mi) municipality was the 300th largest by area out of the 689 municipalities in Norway. Lunde Municipality was the 300th most populous municipality in Norway with a population of about 3,066. The municipality's population density was 11.2 inhabitants per square kilometre (29/sq mi) and its population had decreased by 2.5% over the previous 10-year period.

Lunde Municipality was the production site of the Troll automobile. It is also known as the birthplace of ski racer Atle Skårdal and jazz singer Torun Eriksen.

== General information ==
=== Administrative history ===
The municipality of Lunde was established on 1 January 1867 when Bø Municipality was divided into two: the southern district (population: 2,257) became the new Lunde Municipality and the northern district (population: 2,633) continued as a smaller Bø Municipality.

During the 1960s, there were many municipal mergers across Norway due to the work of the Schei Committee. On 1 January 1964, Lunde Municipality was dissolved and the following areas were merged to form the new Nome Municipality:

- all of Lunde Municipality (population: 3,080)
- most of Holla Municipality (population: 4,093), except for the Valebø area which became part of Skien Municipality

=== Name ===
The municipality and historic Church of Norway parish (sokn) was named after the old Lunde farm (Old Norse: Lundr) since the first Lunde Church was built there. The name is identical to the word lundr which means "grove" or a "clump of trees". The present form Lunde is derived from the singular dative case of the word, lundi.

=== Churches ===
The Church of Norway had one parish (sokn) within Lunde Municipality. At the time of the municipal dissolution, it was part of the Lunde prestegjeld and the Nedre Telemark prosti (deanery) in the Diocese of Agder.

Churches in Lunde Municipality
Parish (sokn)	Church name	Location of the church	Year built
Lunde	Lunde Church	Bjervamoen	1822
Lunde	Landsmarka Chapel	Landsmarka	1895
Ytre Flåbygd	Flåbygd Church	Flåbygd	1822

== Geography ==
The highest point in the municipality was the 749.45-metre (2,458.8 ft) tall mountain Knarren, a tripoint on the border of Lunde Municipality, Kviteseid Municipality, and Drangedal Municipality. Bø Municipality was located to the north, Sauherad Municipality was located to the northeast, Holla Municipality was located to the east, Drangedal Municipality was located to the southwest, and Kviteseid Municipality was located to the west.

== Government ==
While it existed, Lunde Municipality was responsible for primary education (through 10th grade), outpatient health services, senior citizen services, welfare and other social services, zoning, economic development, and municipal roads and utilities. The municipality was governed by a municipal council of directly elected representatives. The mayor was indirectly elected by a vote of the municipal council. The municipality was under the jurisdiction of the Nedre Telemark District Court and the Agder Court of Appeal.

=== Municipal council ===
The municipal council (Heradsstyre) of Lunde Municipality was made up of 25 representatives that were elected to four year terms. The tables below show the historical composition of the council by political party.

Lunde heradsstyre 1959–1963
Party name (in Nynorsk)	Number of representatives
Labour Party (Arbeidarpartiet)	12
Christian Democratic Party (Kristeleg Folkeparti)	3
Centre Party (Senterpartiet)	5
Liberal Party (Venstre)	5
Total number of members:	25
Note: On 1 January 1964, Lunde Municipality became part of Nome Municipality.

Lunde heradsstyre 1955–1959
Party name (in Nynorsk)	Number of representatives
Labour Party (Arbeidarpartiet)	13
Christian Democratic Party (Kristeleg Folkeparti)	3
Farmers' Party (Bondepartiet)	5
Liberal Party (Venstre)	4
Total number of members:	25

Lunde heradsstyre 1951–1955
Party name (in Nynorsk)	Number of representatives
Labour Party (Arbeidarpartiet)	12
Christian Democratic Party (Kristeleg Folkeparti)	3
Farmers' Party (Bondepartiet)	4
Liberal Party (Venstre)	5
Total number of members:	24

Lunde heradsstyre 1947–1951
Party name (in Nynorsk)	Number of representatives
Labour Party (Arbeidarpartiet)	12
Christian Democratic Party (Kristeleg Folkeparti)	4
Farmers' Party (Bondepartiet)	3
Liberal Party (Venstre)	5
Total number of members:	24

Lunde heradsstyre 1945–1947
Party name (in Nynorsk)	Number of representatives
Labour Party (Arbeidarpartiet)	13
Christian Democratic Party (Kristeleg Folkeparti)	4
Farmers' Party (Bondepartiet)	3
Liberal Party (Venstre)	3
List of workers, fishermen, and small farmholders (Arbeidarar, fiskarar, småbrukarar liste)	1
Total number of members:	24

Lunde heradsstyre 1937–1941*
Party name (in Nynorsk)	Number of representatives
Labour Party (Arbeidarpartiet)	11
Farmers' Party (Bondepartiet)	7
Liberal Party (Venstre)	3
Local List(s) (Lokale lister)	3
Total number of members:	24
Note: Due to the German occupation of Norway during World War II, no elections were held for new municipal councils until after the war ended in 1945.

=== Mayors ===
The mayor (Nynorsk: ordførar) of Lunde Municipality was the political leader of the municipality and the chairperson of the municipal council. The following people have held this position:

- 1867–1871: O.T. Steen
- 1872–1881: Tyke Gunnarsen Lundtveit
- 1882–1883: Tor Torsen Hvaala
- 1884–1904: Eilev Johannessen Lunde
- 1905–1910: Aslak Tykesen Lunde
- 1911–1925: Olav Olavsen Ajer (Bp)
- 1926–1928: Andres Gregarsen Sundbø (Bp)
- 1928–1931: Thor Hogga (Ap)
- 1931–1934: Andres Gregarsen Sundbø (Bp)
- 1934–1937: Sverre Liestøl (Ap)
- 1937–1940: Øystein Kleppe (Bp)
- 1941–1945: Halvor Skjellaug (NS)
- 1945–1945: Øystein Kleppe (Bp)
- 1946–1947: Thor Hogga (Ap)
- 1948–1951: Torstein Børte (V)
- 1951–1959: Olav Haugane (Ap)
- 1959–1963: Torstein Børte (V)

== See also ==
- List of former municipalities of Norway
