= Holla Municipality =

Former municipality in Telemark, Norway

Holla Municipality Holla herred
- Former municipality
- Hollen herred (historic name); Holden herred (historic name)
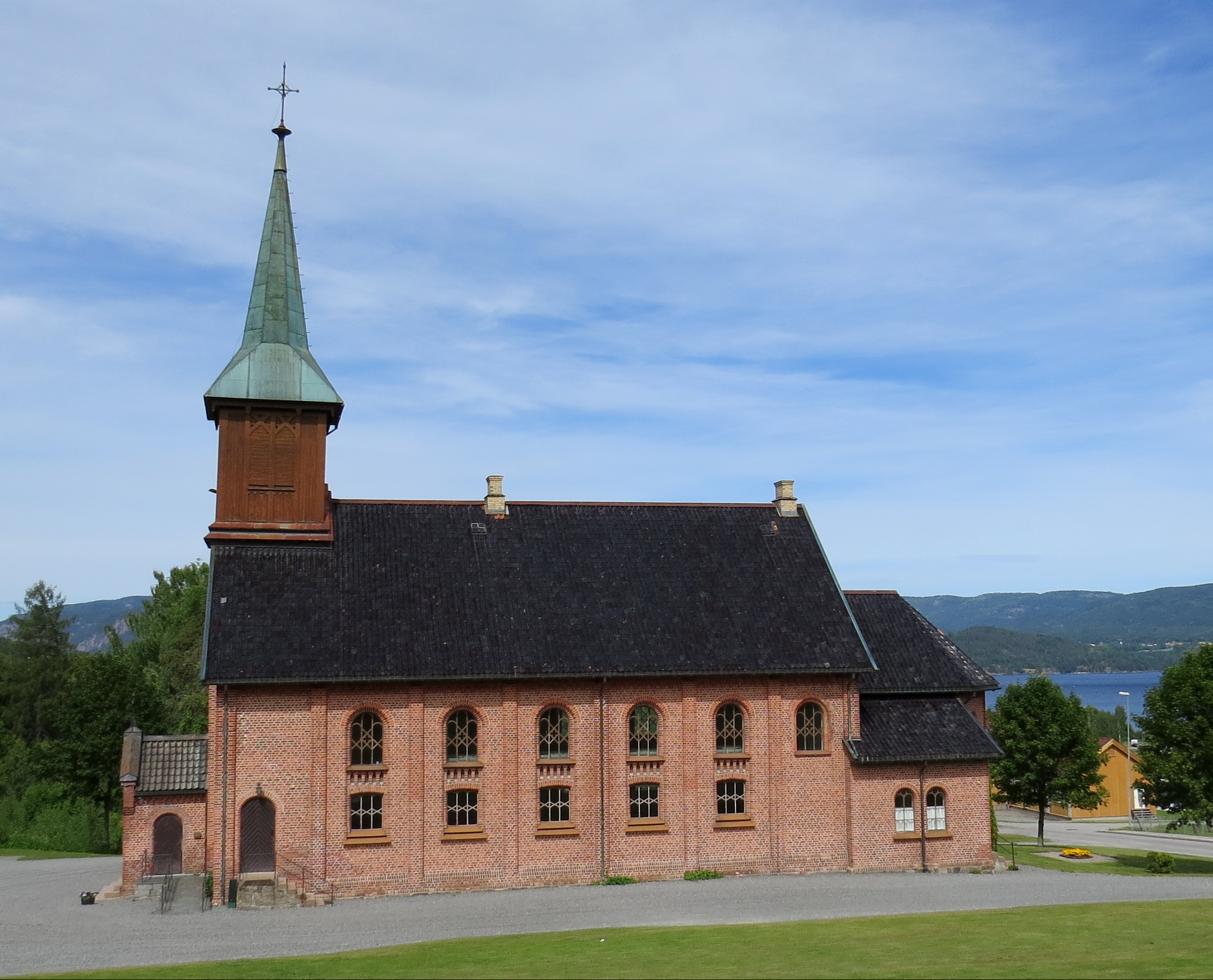
- View of the local church

- Telemark within Norway

- Holla within Telemark
- Coordinates: 59°16′57″N 9°15′56″E
- Country: Norway
- County: Telemark
- District: Grenland
- Established: 1 Jan 1838
  - Created as: Formannskapsdistrikt
- Disestablished: 1 Jan 1964
  - Succeeded by: Nome Municipality
- Administrative centre: Ulefoss

Government
  - Mayor (1960–1963): Johannes Kabbe (Ap)

Area (upon dissolution)
  - Total: 257.8 km^{2} (99.5 sq mi)
  - Rank: #318 in Norway
- Highest elevation (Austre Nuke): 454 m (1,490 ft)

Population (1963)
  - Total: 4,350
  - Rank: #203 in Norway
  - Density: 16.9/km^{2} (44/sq mi)
  - Change (10 years): ▲ +1.6%
- Demonym: Hollasokning

Official language
  - Norwegian form: Neutral
- Time zone: UTC+01:00 (CET)
  - Summer (DST): UTC+02:00 (CEST)
- ISO 3166 code: NO-0819

Holla (Norwegian pronunciation: [¹hɔlːɑ]; locally [¹hɔɽːɑ]) is a former municipality in Telemark county, Norway. The 257.8-square-kilometre (99.5 sq mi) municipality existed from 1838 until its dissolution in 1964. The area is now divided between Nome Municipality and Skien Municipality. The municipality was historically considered part of the traditional district of Grenland, but in 1964 after becoming part of the new Nome Municipality, it has been considered to be part of the Midt-Telemark district. The administrative centre was the village of Ulefoss.

Prior to its dissolution in 1964, the 257.8-square-kilometre (99.5 sq mi) municipality was the 318th largest by area out of the 689 municipalities in Norway. Holla Municipality was the 203rd most populous municipality in Norway with a population of about 4,350. The municipality's population density was 16.9 inhabitants per square kilometre (44/sq mi) and its population had increased by 1.6% over the previous 10-year period.

== General information ==
View of Ulefoss c. 1900

View of Ulefoss c. 1885

Landscape in Holla

=== Administrative history ===
The formannskapsdistrikt law of 1837 created a system of local government in Norway by establishing each town (ladested or kjøpstad) and each Church of Norway prestegjeld as a civil municipality. On 1 January 1838, Hollen prestegjeld was established as Holden Municipality (later spelled Hollen, then Holla). On 1 January 1866, an unpopulated area of Bø Municipality was transferred into Hollen Municipality.

During the 1960s, there were many municipal mergers across Norway due to the work of the Schei Committee. On 1 January 1964, the Valebø area (population: 259) was transferred to the neighboring Skien Municipality. On the same date, the rest of Holla Municipality was dissolved and the following areas were merged to form the new Nome Municipality:

- the rest of Holla Municipality (population: 4,093)
- all of Lunde Municipality (population: 3,080)

=== Name ===
The municipality is named after the old Hollen prestegjeld. The prestegjeld was named after the old Hollen farm (Old Norse: Hǫllin) since the first Holla Church was built there. The first element is derived from the word hallr which means "sloping" or "leaning". The last element is derived from the word vin which means "meadow" or "pasture".

Historically, the name of the municipality was spelled Holden. In 1889, the spelling was changed to Hollen. On 3 November 1917, a royal resolution changed the spelling of the name of the municipality to Holla.

=== Churches ===
The Church of Norway had one parish (sokn) within Holla Municipality. At the time of the municipal dissolution, it was part of the Holla prestegjeld and the Nedre Telemark prosti (deanery) in the Diocese of Agder.

Churches in Holla Municipality
Parish (sokn)	Church name	Location of the church	Year built
Helgen	Helgen Church	Helgja	1735
Holla	Holla Church	Ulefoss	1867
Holla	Valebø Church	Valebø	1903

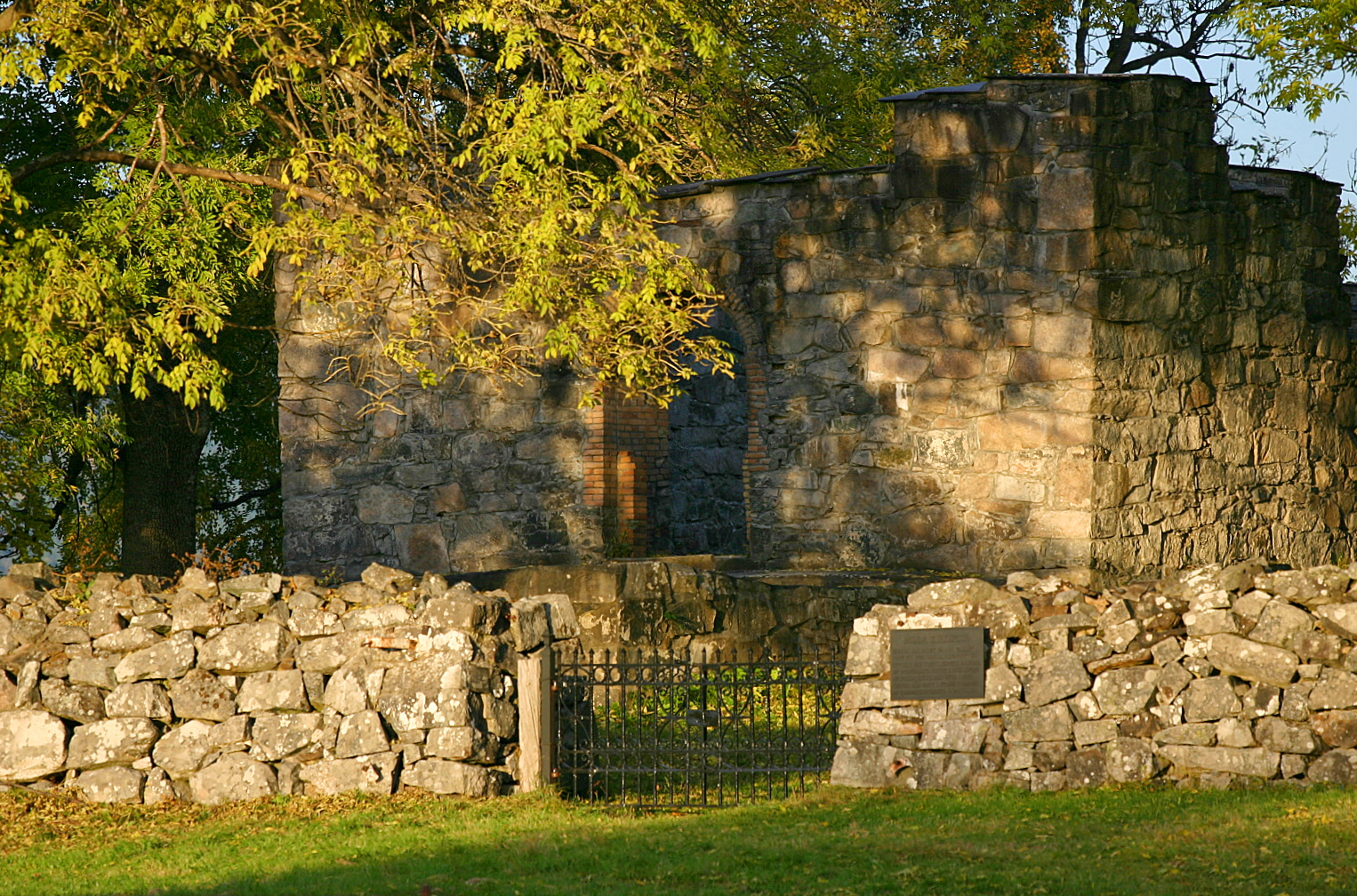
Holla church ruins

==== Holla Church ruins ====
The Old Holla Church was a medieval stone church that was situated near the Holla gård in today's Ulefoss. The church had a view over lake Norsjø. Today only the ruins (Holla kyrkjeruin) are left.

==== Holla Church ====
Holla Church (Holla Kirke) is a Gothic Revival-style church which dates from 1867. The church was donated to the community by Severin Diderik Cappelen (1820-1881) who was the owner of Ulefos Jernværk and served as mayor in Holla. The structure is made of brick and has about 600 seats. The architect was Peter Høier Holtermann (1820-1865). The church was restored during 1916.

== Geography ==
The highest point in the municipality was the 454-metre (1,490 ft) tall mountain Austre Nuke. Sauherad Municipality was located to the north, Gjerpen Municipality was located to the east, Solum Municipality was located to the south, Drangedal Municipality was located to the southwest, and Lunde Municipality was located to the west.

== Government ==
While it existed, Holla Municipality was responsible for primary education (through 10th grade), outpatient health services, senior citizen services, welfare and other social services, zoning, economic development, and municipal roads and utilities. The municipality was governed by a municipal council of directly elected representatives. The mayor was indirectly elected by a vote of the municipal council. The municipality was under the jurisdiction of the Nedre Telemark District Court and the Agder Court of Appeal.

=== Municipal council ===
The municipal council (Herredsstyre) of Holla Municipality was made up of 25 representatives that were elected to four year terms. The tables below show the historical composition of the council by political party.

Holla herredsstyre 1959–1963
Party name (in Norwegian)	Number of representatives
Labour Party (Arbeiderpartiet)	16
Conservative Party (Høyre)	1
Christian Democratic Party (Kristelig Folkeparti)	3
Centre Party (Senterpartiet)	3
Liberal Party (Venstre)	2
Total number of members:	25
Note: On 1 January 1964, Holla Municipality was divided between Nome Municipality and Skien Municipality.

Holla herredsstyre 1955–1959
Party name (in Norwegian)	Number of representatives
Labour Party (Arbeiderpartiet)	16
Conservative Party (Høyre)	1
Christian Democratic Party (Kristelig Folkeparti)	3
Farmers' Party (Bondepartiet)	3
Liberal Party (Venstre)	2
Total number of members:	25

Holla herredsstyre 1951–1955
Party name (in Norwegian)	Number of representatives
Labour Party (Arbeiderpartiet)	15
Communist Party (Kommunistiske Parti)	1
Christian Democratic Party (Kristelig Folkeparti)	4
Joint List(s) of Non-Socialist Parties (Borgerlige Felleslister)	8
Total number of members:	28

Holla herredsstyre 1947–1951
Party name (in Norwegian)	Number of representatives
Labour Party (Arbeiderpartiet)	14
Communist Party (Kommunistiske Parti)	3
Christian Democratic Party (Kristelig Folkeparti)	7
Farmers' Party (Bondepartiet)	2
Liberal Party (Venstre)	5
Joint list of the Liberal Party (Venstre) and the Radical People's Party (Radikale Folkepartiet)	3
Total number of members:	34

Holla herredsstyre 1945–1947
Party name (in Norwegian)	Number of representatives
Labour Party (Arbeiderpartiet)	14
Communist Party (Kommunistiske Parti)	3
Christian Democratic Party (Kristelig Folkeparti)	4
Joint List(s) of Non-Socialist Parties (Borgerlige Felleslister)	11
Total number of members:	32

Holla herredsstyre 1937–1941*
Party name (in Norwegian)	Number of representatives
Labour Party (Arbeiderpartiet)	16
Farmers' Party (Bondepartiet)	3
Liberal Party (Venstre)	5
Joint list of the Conservative Party (Høyre) and the Farmers' Party (Bondepartiet)	2
Joint List(s) of Non-Socialist Parties (Borgerlige Felleslister)	4
Local List(s) (Lokale lister)	2
Total number of members:	32
Note: Due to the German occupation of Norway during World War II, no elections were held for new municipal councils until after the war ended in 1945.

=== Mayors ===
The mayor (Norwegian: ordfører) of Holla Municipality was the political leader of the municipality and the chairperson of the municipal council. The following people have held this position:

- 1838–1841: Fr. Rolsted
- 1841–1845: Rev. W.L. Beylegaard
- 1845–1847: Fr. Rolsted
- 1847–1859: F.K. Dahl
- 1860–1867: S.D. Cappelen
- 1868–1871: Nils Aall
- 1872–1875: John Bentsen Vale
- 1876–1883: Isak Abrahamsen Bjerva
- 1884–1885: P. Pedersen Ytterbøe
- 1886–1887: John Bentsen Vale
- 1888–1889: Ole Nilsen Namlaus
- 1890–1895: P. Pedersen Ytterbøe
- 1896–1898: Halvor H. Susaas
- 1899–1901: Ole A. Melteig
- 1902–1904: Peder Helgen
- 1905–1910: Peder Thorvald Tveten
- 1911–1916: Peder Helgen
- 1917–1925: Herman Halvorsen
- 1926–1930: Steinar Aarhus
- 1930–1931: Halvor Øygarden
- 1932–1937: Olav Mæland
- 1938–1941: Knut Dukane (Ap)
- 1941–1941: H. Haukvik (NS)
- 1941–1943: Jonas Vale (NS)
- 1943–1945: John Haugerud (NS)
- 1945–1946: Knut Dukane (Ap)
- 1946–1959: Ingolf Solvold (Ap)
- 1960–1963: Johannes Kabbe (Ap)

== See also ==
- List of former municipalities of Norway
