= Borte (disambiguation) =

Börte (c. 1161 – 1230) was the wife of Temüjin, the founder of the Mongol Empire.

Borte, Börte, Boerte or Børte is a given name and surname. Notable people with the name include:

- Derrick Borte (born 1967), German-born American filmmaker
- Torstein Børte (1899–1985), Norwegian politician
