= Eidselva =

River in Nome, Telemark, Norway

Eidselva Lundeelva (unofficial)
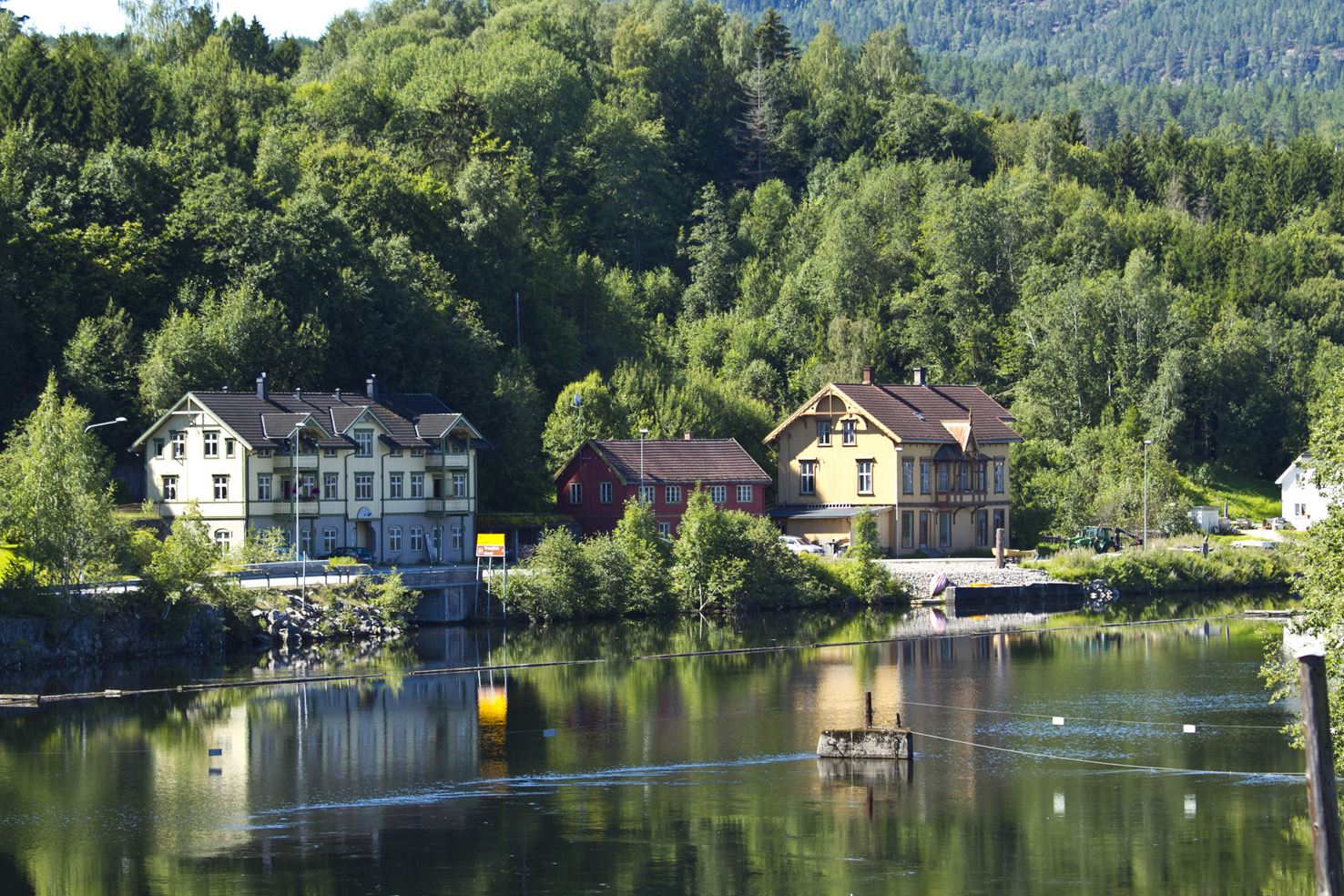
- View of the river Eidselva

Location
- Country: Norway
- County: Telemark
- Municipalities: Nome Municipality

Physical characteristics
- Source: Nomevatnet lake
  - location: Bjervamoen, Nome Municipality
  - coordinates: 59.30027°N 9.1663742°E
  - elevation: 60 metres (200 ft)
- Mouth: Norsjø lake
  - location: Ulefoss, Nome Municipality
  - coordinates: 59.286446°N 9.2631053°E
  - elevation: 16 metres (52 ft)
- Length: 7.5 km (4.7 mi)

Basin features
- River system: Skiensvassdraget

Eidselva is a river in Nome Municipality in Telemark county, Norway. The 7.5-kilometre (4.7 mi) long river is part of Skiensvassdraget watershed and it is an important part of the Telemark Canal system. The river begins at the lake Nomevatnet, just east of the village of Bjervamoen and flows to the east and south into the large lake Norsjø at the village of Ulefoss.

Throughout its course, there are six sluices (14 sluicegates), with a total rise of around 57 metres (187 ft). In the river, there are four hydroelectric power stations: Eidsfoss, Vrangfoss, Ulefoss, and Aall-Ulefoss.

== See also ==
- List of rivers in Norway
