= Flåbygd Church =

Church in Telemark, Norway

- Flåbygd kirke
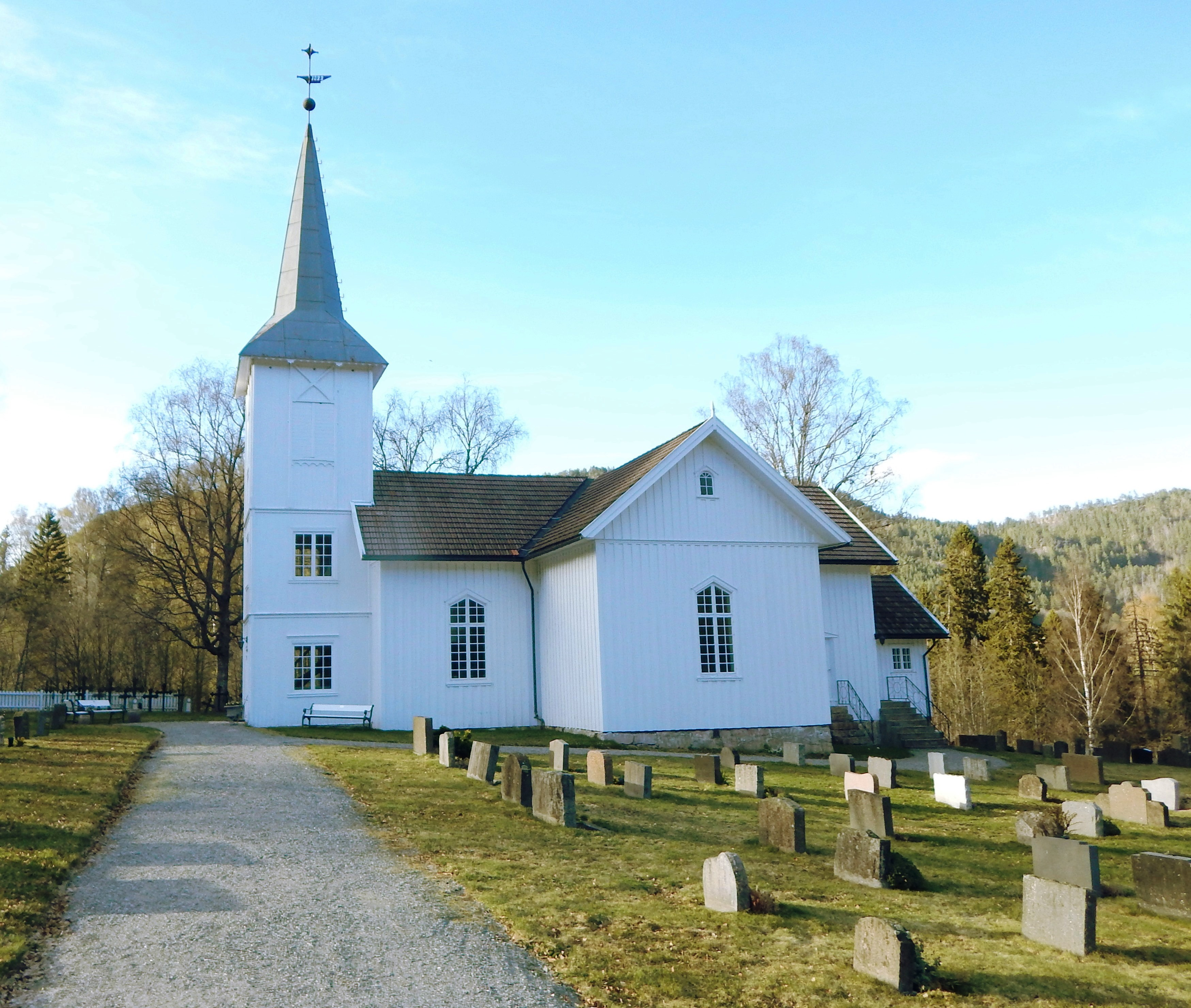
- View of the church
- Flåbygd Church
- 59°19′13″N 8°59′09″E
- Location: Nome Municipality, Telemark
- Country: Norway
- Denomination: Church of Norway
- Churchmanship: Evangelical Lutheran

History
- Status: Parish church
- Founded: 1822
- Consecrated: 30 August 1822

Architecture
- Functional status: Active
- Architect: Gunnar Knutson Saga
- Architectural type: Cruciform
- Completed: 1822 (204 years ago)

Specifications
- Capacity: 180
- Materials: Wood

Administration
- Diocese: Agder og Telemark
- Deanery: Øvre Telemark prosti
- Parish: Lunde og Flåbygd
- Norwegian Cultural Heritage Site
- Type: Church
- Status: Automatically protected
- ID: 85892

Flåbygd Church (Norwegian: Flåbygd kirke) is a parish church of the Church of Norway in Nome Municipality in Telemark county, Norway. It is located in the village of Flåbygd. It is one of the churches in the Lunde og Flåbygd parish which is part of the Øvre Telemark prosti (deanery) in the Diocese of Agder og Telemark. The white, wooden church was built in a cruciform design in 1822 using plans drawn up by the architect Gunnar Knutson Saga. The church seats about 180 people.

== History ==
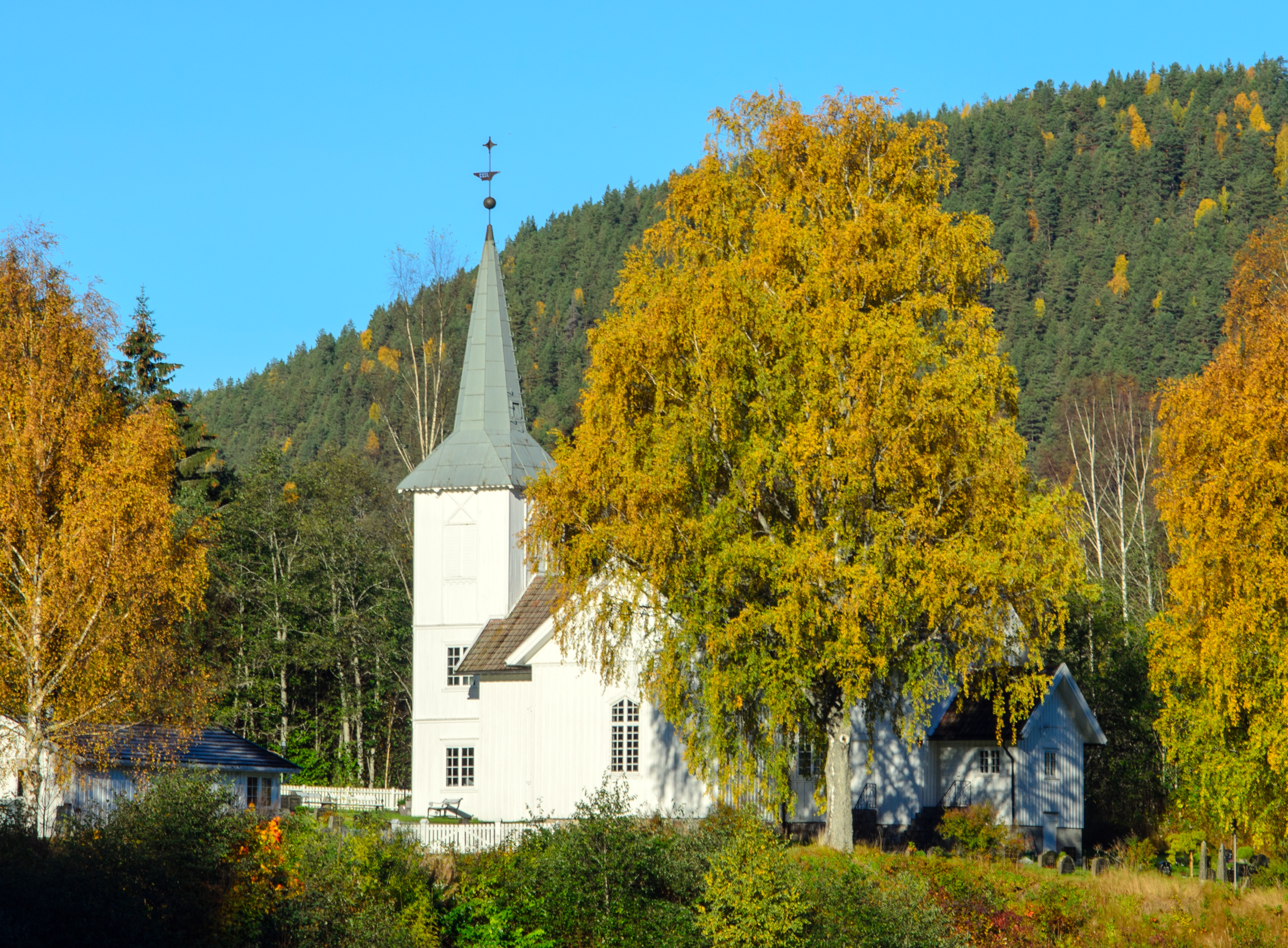
View of the church

The people of Flåbygd were part of the large Kviteseid Church parish for many years, but it was a long route to travel to get to church. In the early 1800s, work began to build an annex chapel in Flåbygd. Timber for construction and land for the church and cemetery was given by Niels Aall from Ulefoss, and the church was built by Gunnar Knutson Saga. Construction on the church was carried out from 1818 until 1822. The new church was consecrated on 30 August 1822. Flåbygd church is a log building with a cruciform design. There is a choir in the eastern transept with a sacristy in a small extension off the choir.

In 1845 the church was transferred to the Bø Church parish. In 1847, there was a desire to move the church to Røymålhaugen on the opposite side of the river that the church was located on, but this was never carried out. The church initially was built with exposed logs on the exterior, but it received external paneling and was painted in 1864. Also in 1864, the original pulpit altar (Norwegian: Prekestolalter) was removed and the present altar was installed. In 1866, the Flåbygd Church and nearby Lunde Church were put together into the newly created Lunde Church parish.

Originally, the church had a small tower on the center of the nave roof, but during a renovation in 1877, the tower was removed and a new west tower with a church porch was built at the main entrance to the church. Also during this renovation, the interior walls of the church were paneled to cover up the exposed log construction. There were also major repairs in 1910. Again in 1953–1955, another major renovation was carried out according to plans by Ragnar Nilsen and with Finn Krafft as a consultant. During this project, the wood paneling was removed from inside the church to show the timber construction.

== See also ==
- List of churches in Agder og Telemark
