= Nome Municipality =

Municipality in Telemark, Norway

Nome Municipality Nome kommune
- Municipality
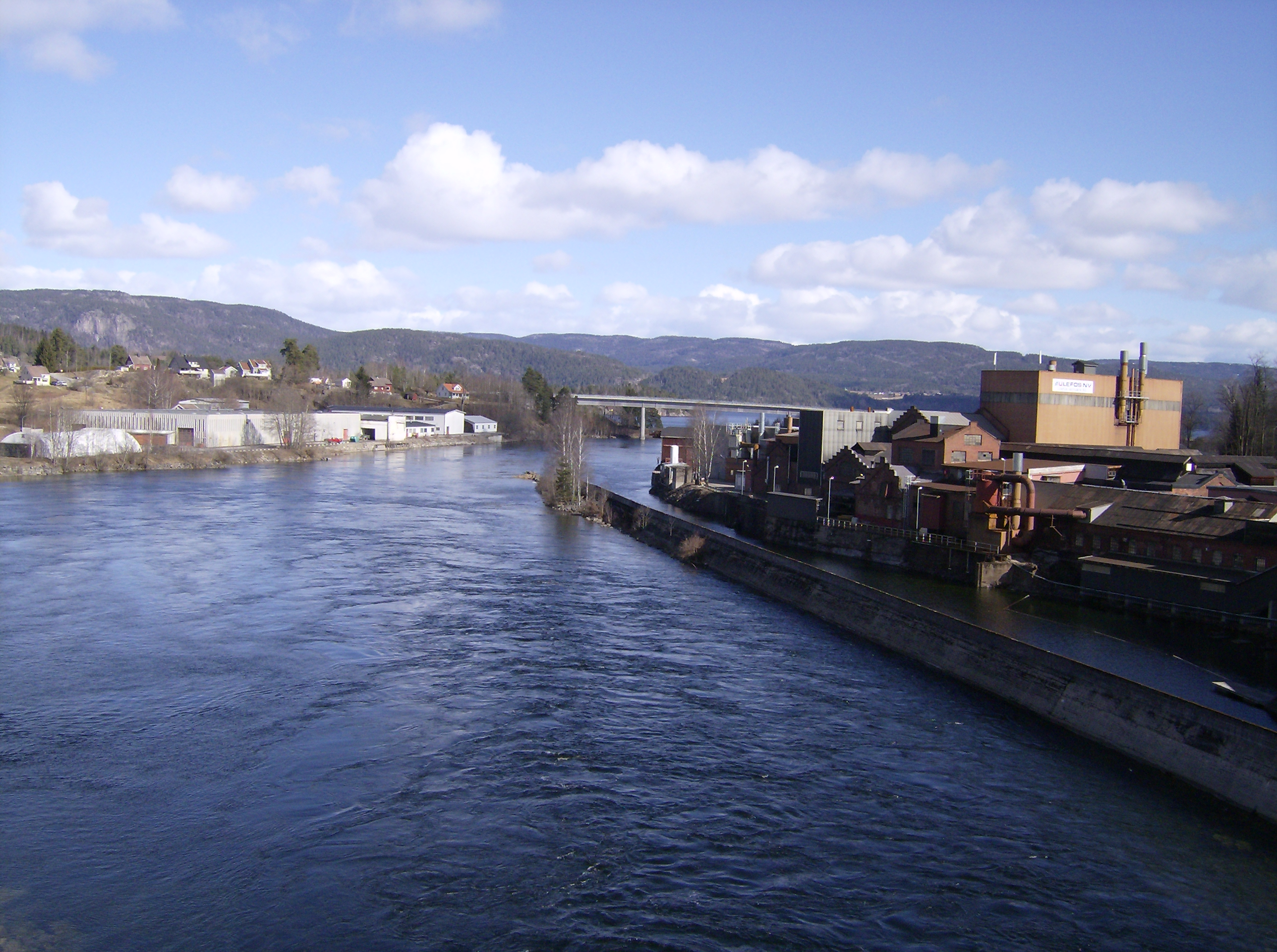
- View of Ulefoss

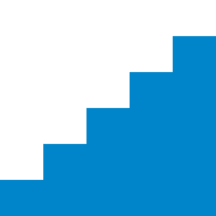
- Flag Coat of arms

- Telemark within Norway

- Nome within Telemark
- Coordinates: 59°17′5″N 9°7′26″E
- Country: Norway
- County: Telemark
- District: Midt-Telemark
- Established: 1 Jan 1964
  - Preceded by: Holla Municipality & Lunde Municipality
- Administrative centre: Ulefoss

Government
  - Mayor (2023): Linda Therese Thorstensen (Ap)

Area
  - Total: 429.67 km^{2} (165.90 sq mi)
  - Land: 385.42 km^{2} (148.81 sq mi)
  - Water: 44.25 km^{2} (17.09 sq mi) 10.3%
  - Rank: #229 in Norway
- Highest elevation (Knarren): 749.45 m (2,458.8 ft)

Population (2026)
  - Total: 6,529
  - Rank: #150 in Norway
  - Density: 16.9/km^{2} (44/sq mi)
  - Change (10 years): ▼ −0.1%
- Demonym(s): Hollasokning or Lundhering

Official language
  - Norwegian form: Neutral
- Time zone: UTC+01:00 (CET)
  - Summer (DST): UTC+02:00 (CEST)
- ISO 3166 code: NO-4018
- Website: Official website

Nome (Norwegian pronunciation: [¹nuːme]; locally [¹nuːmæ]) is a municipality in Telemark county, Norway. It is located in the traditional district of Midt-Telemark and historically part of the Grenland region. The administrative centre of the municipality is the village of Ulefoss. Other villages include Bjervamoen, Ulefoss, Helgja, Flåbygd, and Svenseid.

The 429.67-square-kilometre (165.90 sq mi) municipality is the 229th largest by area out of the 357 municipalities in Norway. Nome Municipality is the 150th most populous municipality in Norway with a population of 6,529. The municipality's population density is 16.9 inhabitants per square kilometre (44/sq mi) and its population has decreased by 0.1% over the previous 10-year period.

Nome is a large agricultural and forestry municipality. The agricultural area in Nome is approximately 27,000 decares (10 mi^{2}). Forest harvesting averaged 36,000 cubic metres (1,300,000 cu ft) annually in the five-year period 2017–2021. Just over half was spruce, the rest was pine.

== General information ==
=== Administrative history ===
During the 1960s, there were many municipal changes across Norway due to the work of the Schei Committee. The municipality of Nome was established on 1 January 1964 when the following areas were merged to form an the new municipality:

- all of Lunde Municipality (population: 3,080)
- most of Holla Municipality (population: 4,093), except for the Valebø area east of the lake Norsjø which became part of Skien Municipality

The borders of the municipality have not changed since that time (which is pretty rare among municipalities in Norway).

In 2020, there were many municipal and county mergers across Norway due to the work of the Solberg cabinet. Historically, this municipality was part of Telemark county. On 1 January 2020, the municipality became a part of the newly-formed Vestfold og Telemark county (after Telemark and Vestfold counties were merged). The merger was shortlived, and on 1 January 2024, the merger was undone and this municipality became part of Telemark county once again.

=== Name ===
The municipality is named after the lake Nomevatnet which is at the start of the river Eidselva. The meaning of the name is uncertain. It may be related to the first element in the name Numedal.

=== Coat of arms ===
The coat of arms was granted on 10 March 1989. The official blazon is "Per bend sinistre dancetty argent and azure" (Norwegian: Venstre skrådelt av sølv og blått ved trappesnitt). This means the arms are divided with a diagonal line that is dancetty (in the shape of steps). The field (background) below the line has a tincture of blue. Above the line, the field has a tincture of argent which means it is commonly colored white, but if it is made out of metal, then silver is used. The design is meant to represent the Telemark Canal and its locks to raise and lower boats. The canal was built in the 19th century and it runs through the municipality, connecting the lake Bandak to the North Sea. The arms were designed by Øyvind Larsen. The municipal flag has the same design as the coat of arms.

=== Churches ===
The Church of Norway has two parishes (sokn) within Nome Municipality. It is part of the Øvre Telemark prosti (deanery) in the Diocese of Agder og Telemark.

Churches in Nome Municipality
Parish (sokn)	Church name	Location of the church	Year built
Holla og Helgen	Helgen Church	Helgja	1735
Holla og Helgen	Holla Church	Ulefoss	1867
Holla og Helgen	Romnes Church	Romnes	1100s
Lunde og Flåbygd	Flåbygd Church	Flåbygd	1822
Lunde og Flåbygd	Landsmarka Chapel	Landsmarka	1895
Lunde og Flåbygd	Lunde Church	Bjervamoen	1822

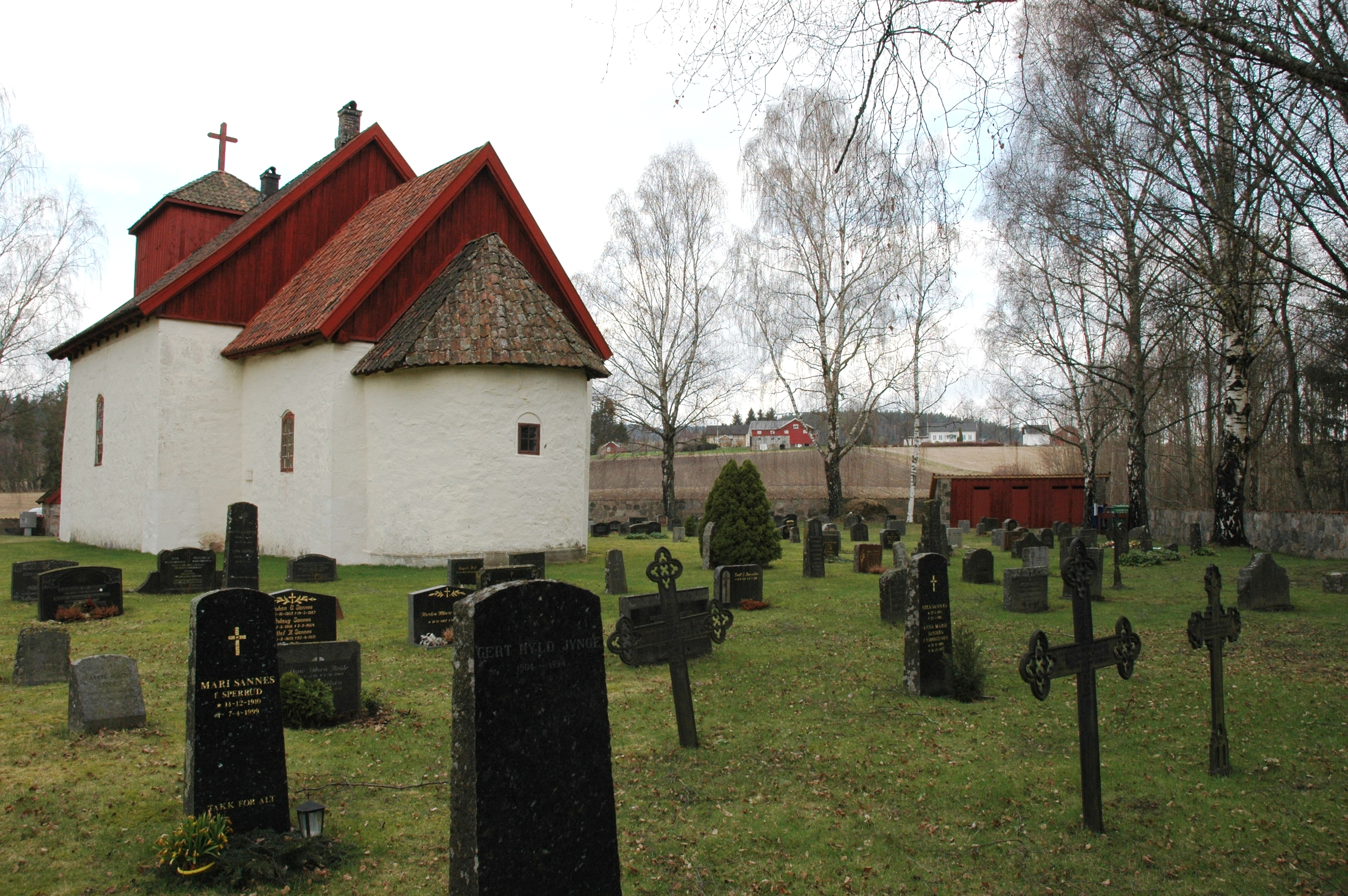
Romnes Church

Romnes Church (Romnes kirke) is a Romanesque stone church that was built between 1150 and 1250. The church was constructed of stone joined with lime, while the corners consist of limestone. The apse and nave has a flat ceiling, while the choir has vaulted wood ceilings. The entrance portal to the west is of decorated stone. The church also had an entrance on the south wall in the choir. The pulpit and baroque altarpiece are from the 1700s. The square bell tower dates to the end of the 1800s. The church currently has curved red bricks on the roof. During the restoration in 1921, murals from the late Middle Ages were restored. Additional restoration was conducted between 1966 and 1967.

== Geography ==
The highest point in the municipality is the 749.45-metre (2,458.8 ft) tall mountain Knarren, a tripoint on the border between Nome Municipality, Kviteseid Municipality, and Drangedal Municipality.

Midt-Telemark Municipality is located to the north, Skien Municipality is located to the east, Drangedal Municipality is located to the south, and Kviteseid Municipality is located to the west.

== Government ==
Nome Municipality is responsible for primary education (through 10th grade), outpatient health services, senior citizen services, welfare and other social services, zoning, economic development, and municipal roads and utilities. The municipality is governed by a municipal council of directly elected representatives. The mayor is indirectly elected by a vote of the municipal council. The municipality is under the jurisdiction of the Nedre Telemark District Court and the Agder Court of Appeal.

=== Municipal council ===
The municipal council (Kommunestyre) of Nome Municipality is made up of 21 representatives that are elected to four-year terms. The tables below show the current and historical composition of the council by political party.

Nome kommunestyre 2023–2027
Party name (in Norwegian)	Number of representatives
Labour Party (Arbeiderpartiet)	7
Progress Party (Fremskrittspartiet)	3
Green Party (Miljøpartiet De Grønne)	1
Conservative Party (Høyre)	3
Norway Democrats (Norgesdemokratene)	1
Centre Party (Senterpartiet)	5
Socialist Left Party (Sosialistisk Venstreparti)	1
Total number of members:	21

Nome kommunestyre 2019–2023
Party name (in Norwegian)	Number of representatives
Labour Party (Arbeiderpartiet)	8
Progress Party (Fremskrittspartiet)	2
Green Party (Miljøpartiet De Grønne)	1
Conservative Party (Høyre)	2
Centre Party (Senterpartiet)	7
Socialist Left Party (Sosialistisk Venstreparti)	1
Total number of members:	21

Nome kommunestyre 2015–2019
Party name (in Norwegian)	Number of representatives
Labour Party (Arbeiderpartiet)	12
Progress Party (Fremskrittspartiet)	4
Conservative Party (Høyre)	3
Christian Democratic Party (Kristelig Folkeparti)	1
Centre Party (Senterpartiet)	7
Socialist Left Party (Sosialistisk Venstreparti)	1
Liberal Party (Venstre)	1
Total number of members:	29

Nome kommunestyre 2011–2015
Party name (in Norwegian)	Number of representatives
Labour Party (Arbeiderpartiet)	12
Progress Party (Fremskrittspartiet)	3
Conservative Party (Høyre)	4
Christian Democratic Party (Kristelig Folkeparti)	2
Centre Party (Senterpartiet)	6
Socialist Left Party (Sosialistisk Venstreparti)	1
Liberal Party (Venstre)	1
Total number of members:	29

Nome kommunestyre 2007–2011
Party name (in Norwegian)	Number of representatives
Labour Party (Arbeiderpartiet)	9
Progress Party (Fremskrittspartiet)	4
Conservative Party (Høyre)	2
Christian Democratic Party (Kristelig Folkeparti)	2
Centre Party (Senterpartiet)	9
Socialist Left Party (Sosialistisk Venstreparti)	1
Cross-party list for Lunde (Tverrpolitisk liste for Lunde)	2
Total number of members:	29

Nome kommunestyre 2003–2007
Party name (in Norwegian)	Number of representatives
Labour Party (Arbeiderpartiet)	6
Progress Party (Fremskrittspartiet)	4
Conservative Party (Høyre)	1
Christian Democratic Party (Kristelig Folkeparti)	2
Centre Party (Senterpartiet)	9
Socialist Left Party (Sosialistisk Venstreparti)	4
Cross-party list for Lunde (Tverrpolitisk liste for Lunde)	3
Total number of members:	29

Nome kommunestyre 1999–2003
Party name (in Norwegian)	Number of representatives
Labour Party (Arbeiderpartiet)	10
Progress Party (Fremskrittspartiet)	3
Conservative Party (Høyre)	3
Christian Democratic Party (Kristelig Folkeparti)	4
Centre Party (Senterpartiet)	4
Socialist Left Party (Sosialistisk Venstreparti)	2
Cross-party list for Lunde (Tverrpolitisk liste for Lunde)	3
Total number of members:	29

Nome kommunestyre 1995–1999
Party name (in Norwegian)	Number of representatives
Labour Party (Arbeiderpartiet)	12
Conservative Party (Høyre)	3
Christian Democratic Party (Kristelig Folkeparti)	3
Centre Party (Senterpartiet)	5
Socialist Left Party (Sosialistisk Venstreparti)	2
Cross-party list for Lunde (Tverrpolitisk liste for Lunde)	4
Total number of members:	29

Nome kommunestyre 1991–1995
Party name (in Norwegian)	Number of representatives
Labour Party (Arbeiderpartiet)	12
Conservative Party (Høyre)	6
Christian Democratic Party (Kristelig Folkeparti)	4
Centre Party (Senterpartiet)	5
Socialist Left Party (Sosialistisk Venstreparti)	6
Cross-party list for Lunde (Tverrpolitisk liste for Lunde)	4
Total number of members:	37

Nome kommunestyre 1987–1991
Party name (in Norwegian)	Number of representatives
Labour Party (Arbeiderpartiet)	16
Conservative Party (Høyre)	5
Christian Democratic Party (Kristelig Folkeparti)	3
Centre Party (Senterpartiet)	3
Socialist Left Party (Sosialistisk Venstreparti)	2
Liberal Party (Venstre)	2
Cross-party list for Lunde (Tverrpolitisk liste for Lunde)	6
Total number of members:	37

Nome kommunestyre 1983–1987
Party name (in Norwegian)	Number of representatives
Labour Party (Arbeiderpartiet)	18
Conservative Party (Høyre)	5
Christian Democratic Party (Kristelig Folkeparti)	4
Centre Party (Senterpartiet)	5
Socialist Left Party (Sosialistisk Venstreparti)	3
Liberal Party (Venstre)	2
Total number of members:	37

Nome kommunestyre 1979–1983
Party name (in Norwegian)	Number of representatives
Labour Party (Arbeiderpartiet)	18
Conservative Party (Høyre)	6
Christian Democratic Party (Kristelig Folkeparti)	4
Centre Party (Senterpartiet)	4
Socialist Left Party (Sosialistisk Venstreparti)	3
Liberal Party (Venstre)	2
Total number of members:	37

Nome kommunestyre 1975–1979
Party name (in Norwegian)	Number of representatives
Labour Party (Arbeiderpartiet)	16
Conservative Party (Høyre)	3
Christian Democratic Party (Kristelig Folkeparti)	6
Centre Party (Senterpartiet)	6
Socialist Left Party (Sosialistisk Venstreparti)	4
Joint list of the Liberal Party (Venstre) and New People's Party (Nye Folkepartiet)	2
Total number of members:	37

Nome kommunestyre 1971–1975
Party name (in Norwegian)	Number of representatives
Labour Party (Arbeiderpartiet)	17
Conservative Party (Høyre)	2
Christian Democratic Party (Kristelig Folkeparti)	4
Centre Party (Senterpartiet)	6
Socialist People's Party (Sosialistisk Folkeparti)	3
Liberal Party (Venstre)	3
Local List(s) (Lokale lister)	2
Total number of members:	37

Nome kommunestyre 1967–1971
Party name (in Norwegian)	Number of representatives
Labour Party (Arbeiderpartiet)	20
Conservative Party (Høyre)	2
Christian Democratic Party (Kristelig Folkeparti)	3
Centre Party (Senterpartiet)	5
Socialist People's Party (Sosialistisk Folkeparti)	3
Liberal Party (Venstre)	4
Total number of members:	37

Nome kommunestyre 1964–1967
Party name (in Norwegian)	Number of representatives
Labour Party (Arbeiderpartiet)	22
Conservative Party (Høyre)	2
Christian Democratic Party (Kristelig Folkeparti)	3
Centre Party (Senterpartiet)	6
Socialist People's Party (Sosialistisk Folkeparti)	1
Liberal Party (Venstre)	3
Total number of members:	37
Note: On 1 January 1964, Holla Municipality and Lunde Municipality were merged to form the new Nome Municipality.

=== Mayors ===
The mayor (Norwegian: ordfører) of Nome Municipality is the political leader of the municipality and the chairperson of the municipal council. The following people have held this position:

- 1964–1967: Olav Haugane (Ap)
- 1967–1970: Finn Solvold (Ap)
- 1970–1973: Jens Hvilen (Ap)
- 1975–1983: Elna Kabbe (Ap)
- 1983–1991: Ole Moen (Ap)
- 1991–1995: Miklos Vassanyi (H)
- 1995–1999: Ole Moen (Ap)
- 1999–2011: Jan Thorsen (Sp)
- 2011–2023: Bjørg Tveito Lundefaret (Ap)
- 2023–present: Linda Therese Thorstensen (Ap)

== Notable people ==
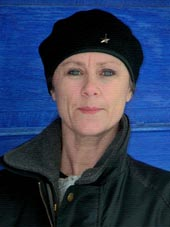
Liv Mildrid Gjernes, 2003

- Baron Herman Severin Løvenskiold (1815 in Ulefoss – 1870), a composer
- August Cappelen (1827–1852), a painter of melancholic, dramatic, and romantic landscapes who was brought up in Holla
- Gisle Straume (1917 in Holla – 1988), an actor and theatre director
- Inge Grødum (born 1943 in Ulefoss), an illustrator
- Knut Ragnar Mikkelsen (born 1951 in Lunde), a police chief
- Odd Einar Haugen (born 1954 in Lunde), a University of Bergen professor of Old Norse philology
- Liv Mildrid Gjernes (born 1954 in Lunde), an artist; eponym for a contemporary style of decoration, sculpture, and furniture design - Gjernes
- Atle Skårdal (born 1966 in Lunde), a former World Cup and Olympic alpine ski racer
- Jon Anders Halvorsen (born 1968 in Lunde), a folk singer and physician
- Erland Dahlen (born 1971 in Ulefoss), a drummer and percussionist
- Torun Eriksen (born 1977 in Lunde), a jazz singer

== Media gallery ==
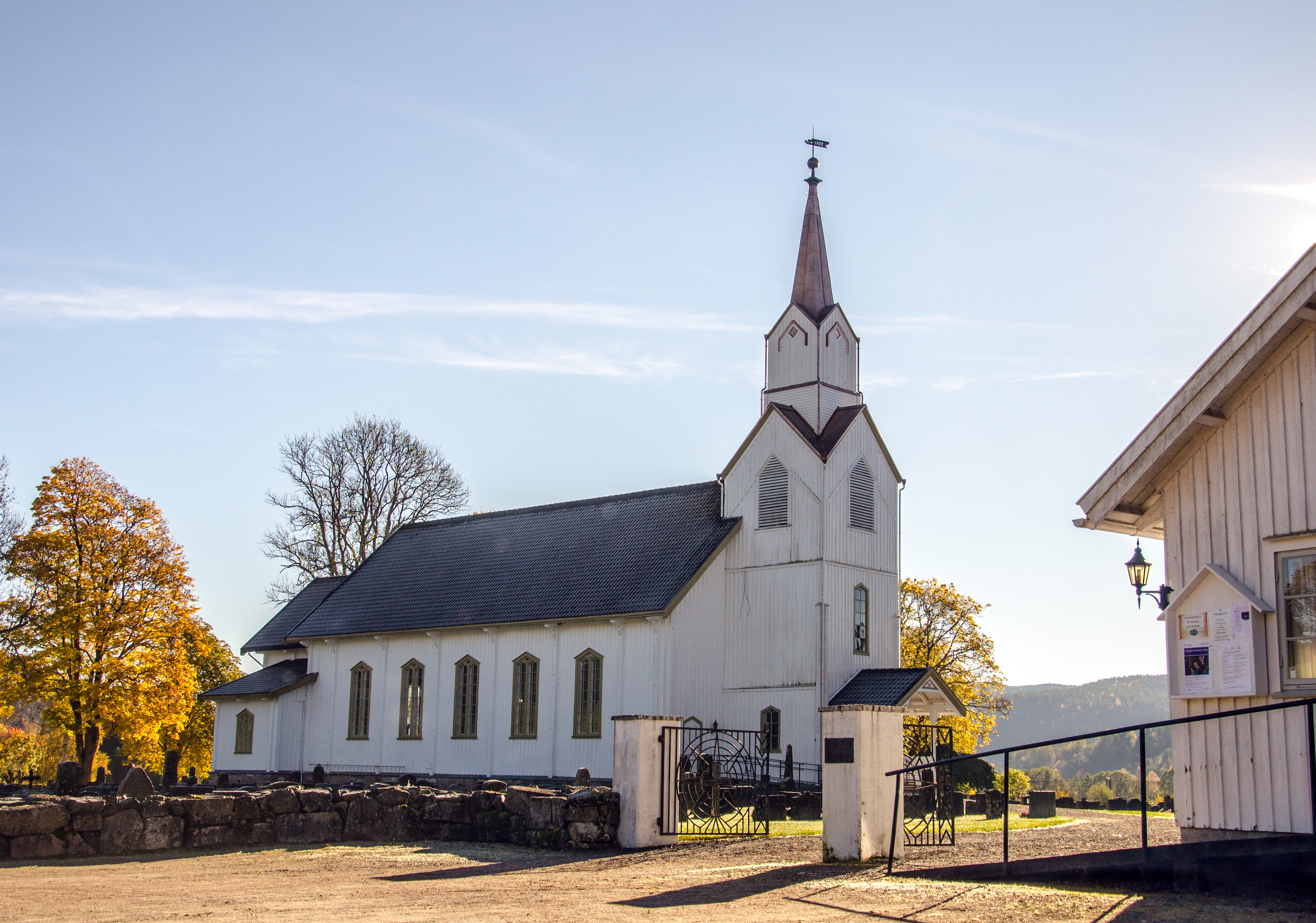
Lunde Kirke

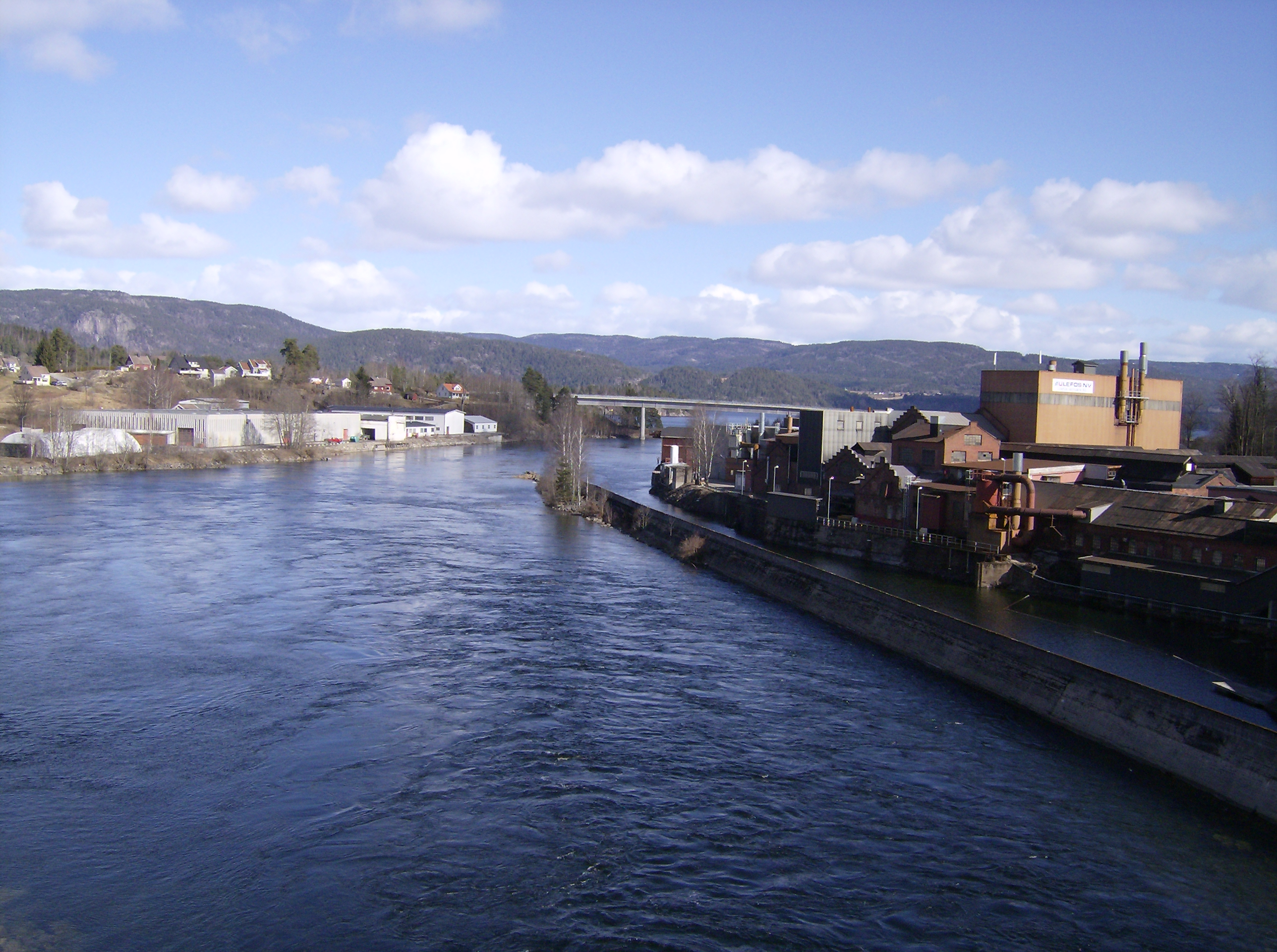
Ulefoss

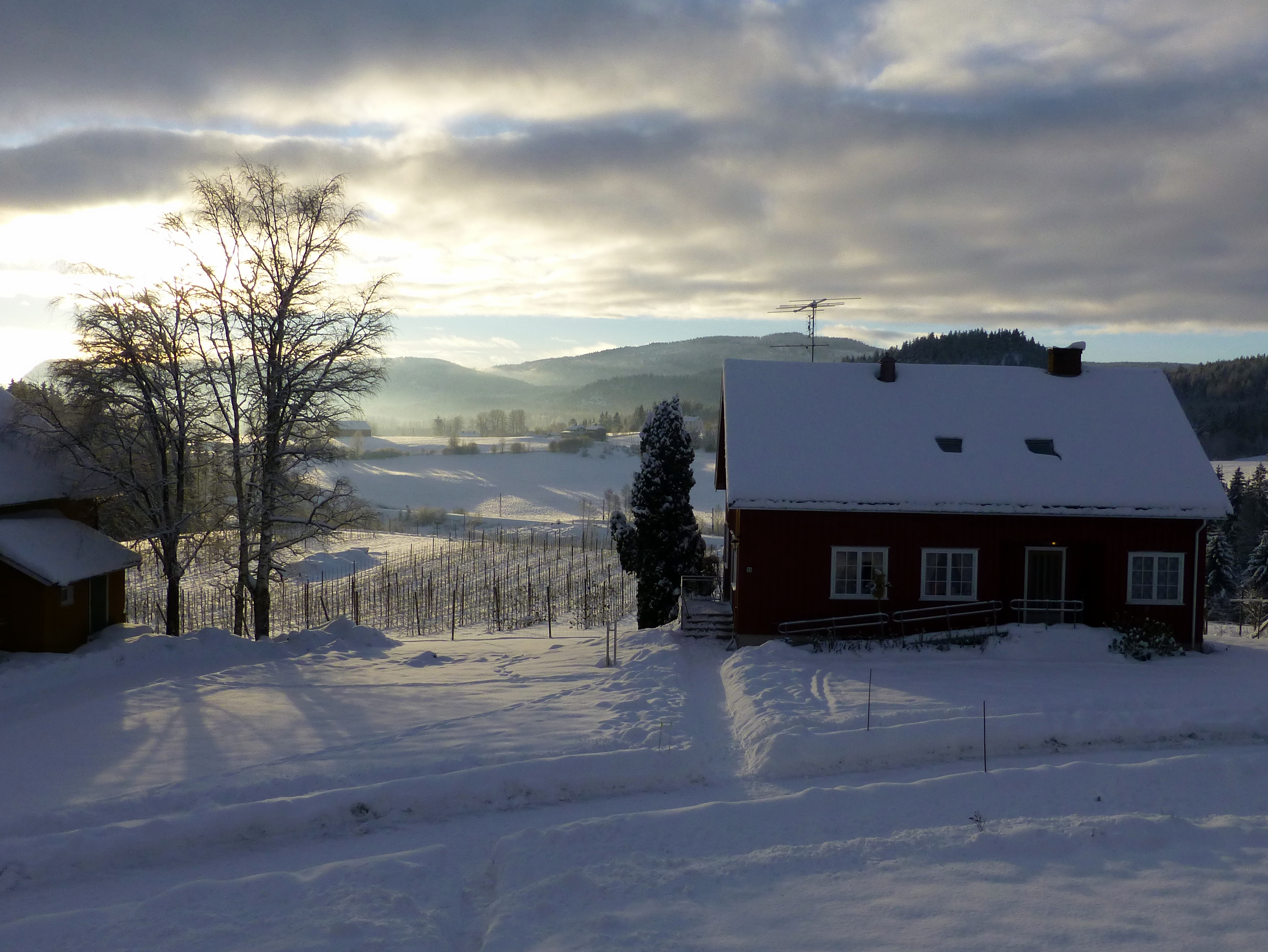
in Børte

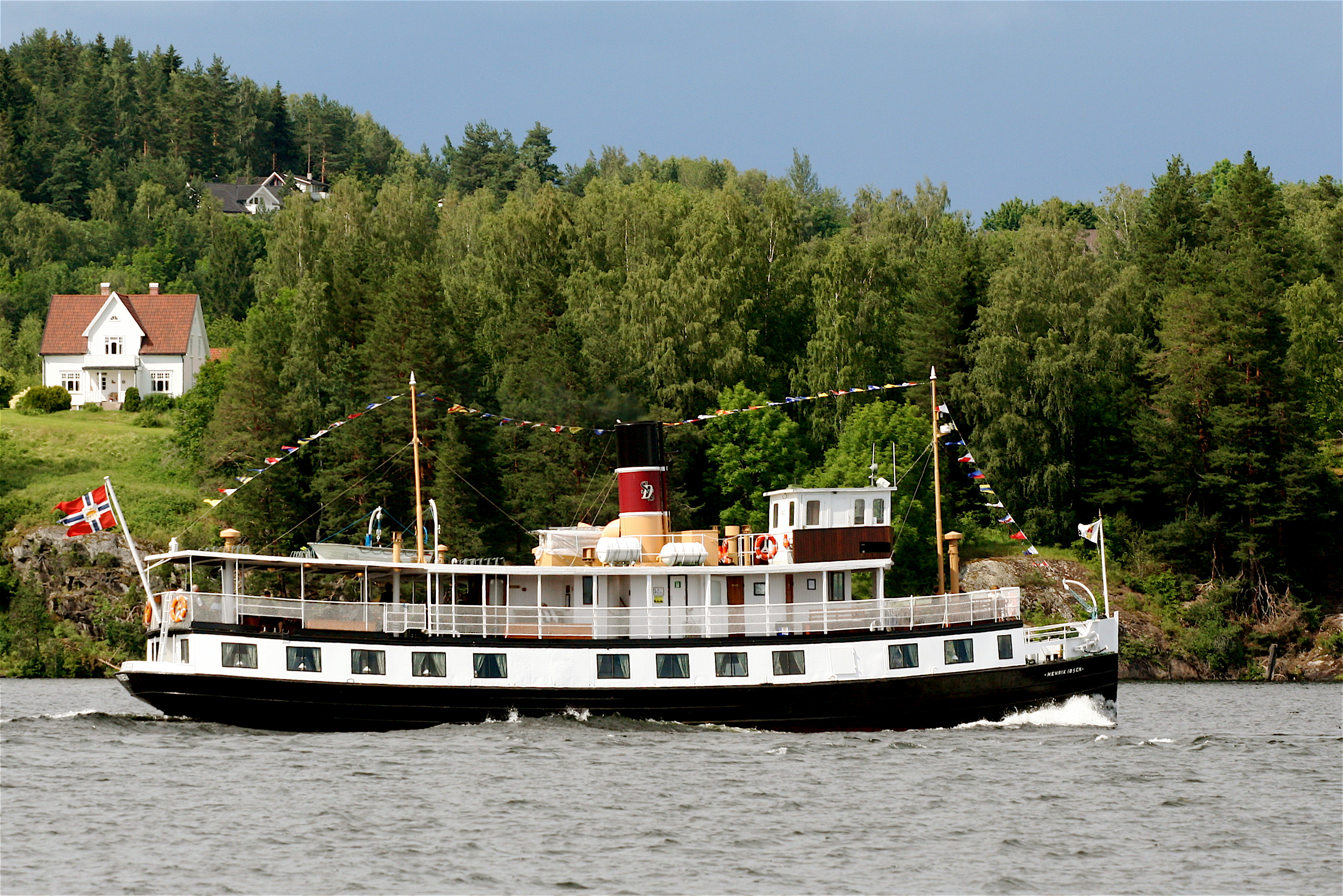
MS "Henrik Ibsen" ved Ulefoss

== See also ==
- Fen Complex (a reserve of rare-earth metals)
