= Liv Mildrid Gjernes =

Norwegian artist

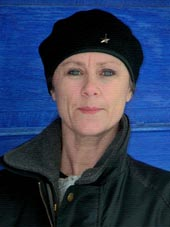
Liv Mildrid Gjernes

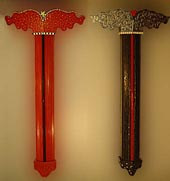
Wedding gift: Liv Mildrid Gjernes: "Ikons for the Hearts"

Liv Mildrid Gjernes (born 2 June 1954 in Lunde, in Telemark, Norway) is a Norwegian artist and craftswoman who specialises in woodcraft. She is the namesake of the Gjernes style, a contemporary style of decoration, sculpture, and furniture design. She lives and works in Eidsfoss, Vestfold in Norway. She studied at Bergen high-school of art and design and at the Institute for Furniture and Room.

In 1983, she formed the free joinery group Gullregn in Bergen along with Lillian Dahle and Elisabeth Engenand, where among other pieces they created mainly chests and cupboards. She has also created public decorations, including an altarpiece in Bergen Landsfengsel (1992) and a wooden relief at the Fredrikstad police cell (1993).

Apart from her private and public sculptural commissions, she was commissioned by the Norwegian government to produce their wedding gift to Princess Märtha Louise and Ari Behn. The gift consisted of two cupboards specially designed for the couple titled "Ikons for the Hearts". In each cupboard there were seven exclusive pieces of handicraft from different regions of Norway, produced by other outstanding Norwegian artists.

She designed and created a room using wood at Kattem Nursing Home in Norway.

As of 2024, she is listed as professor emeritus at Western Norway University of Applied Sciences.

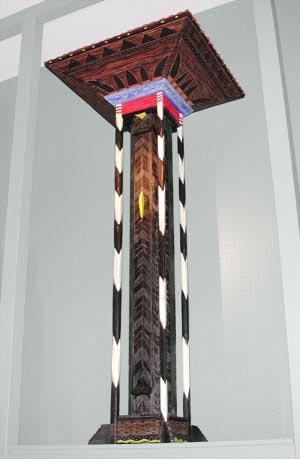
"Home Pagoda"

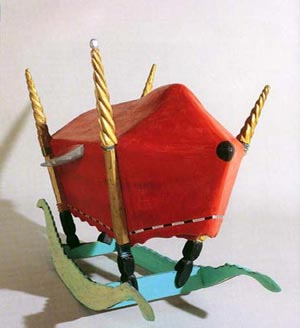
"The future a strange place"
