= Landsmarka Chapel =

Church in Telemark, Norway

- Landsmarka kapell
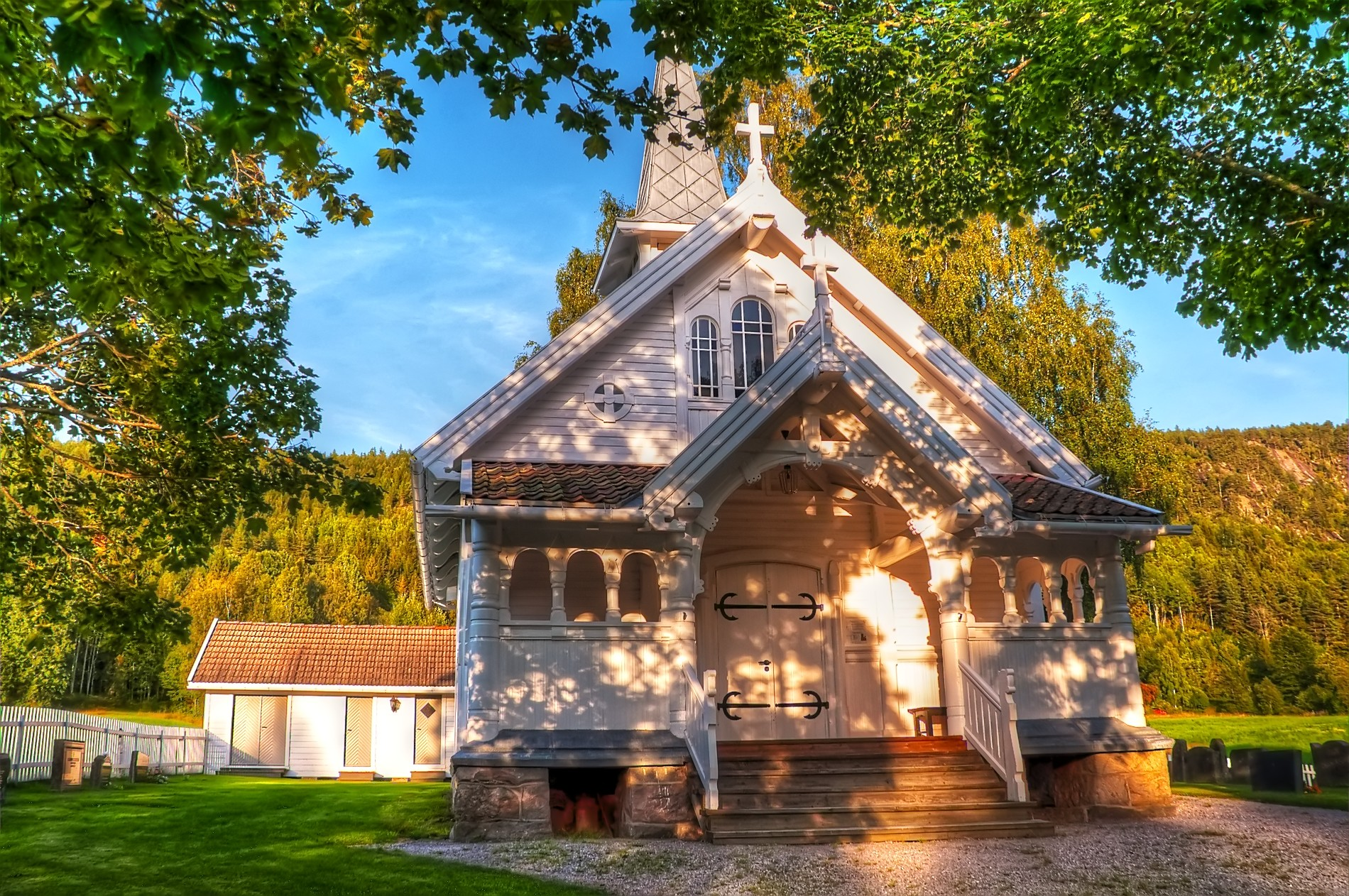
- View of the church
- Landsmarka Chapel
- 59°14′46″N 9°09′39″E
- Location: Nome Municipality, Telemark
- Country: Norway
- Denomination: Church of Norway
- Churchmanship: Evangelical Lutheran

History
- Status: Parish church
- Founded: 1895
- Consecrated: 1 October 1895

Architecture
- Functional status: Active
- Architect: Herman Backer
- Architectural type: Long church
- Style: Dragestil
- Completed: 1895 (131 years ago)

Specifications
- Capacity: 100
- Materials: Wood

Administration
- Diocese: Agder og Telemark
- Deanery: Øvre Telemark prosti
- Parish: Lunde og Flåbygd
- Norwegian Cultural Heritage Site
- Type: Church
- Status: Listed
- ID: 84891

Landsmarka Chapel (Norwegian: Landsmarka kapell) is a parish church of the Church of Norway in Nome Municipality in Telemark county, Norway. It is located in the village of Landsmarka. It is one of the churches in the Lunde og Flåbygd parish which is part of the Øvre Telemark prosti (deanery) in the Diocese of Agder og Telemark. The white, wooden church was built in a long church design in 1895 using plans drawn up by the architect Herman Backer. The church seats about 100 people.

== History ==
Landsmarka is a forest village where people had a long way to go to get to a church (either Lunde Church or Holla Church). Towards the end of the 19th century, efforts were made to get a church building in Landsmarka and eventually the local landowner Diderik Cappelen from the Cappelen family, donated land for a new annex chapel. The architect Herman Backer was hired to design the new building and the builder H. Hansen from Skien was hired to lead the construction. The new chapel was designed in a dragestil style so that its look was reminiscent of the medieval stave churches across Norway. The chapel was consecrated on 1 October 1895. The church is a wooden long church. Originally the chapel was stained dark with several shades, but it has since been painted white.

== See also ==
- List of churches in Agder og Telemark
