= Helgja =

Village in Nome Municipality, Norway

Helgja Helgen
- Village
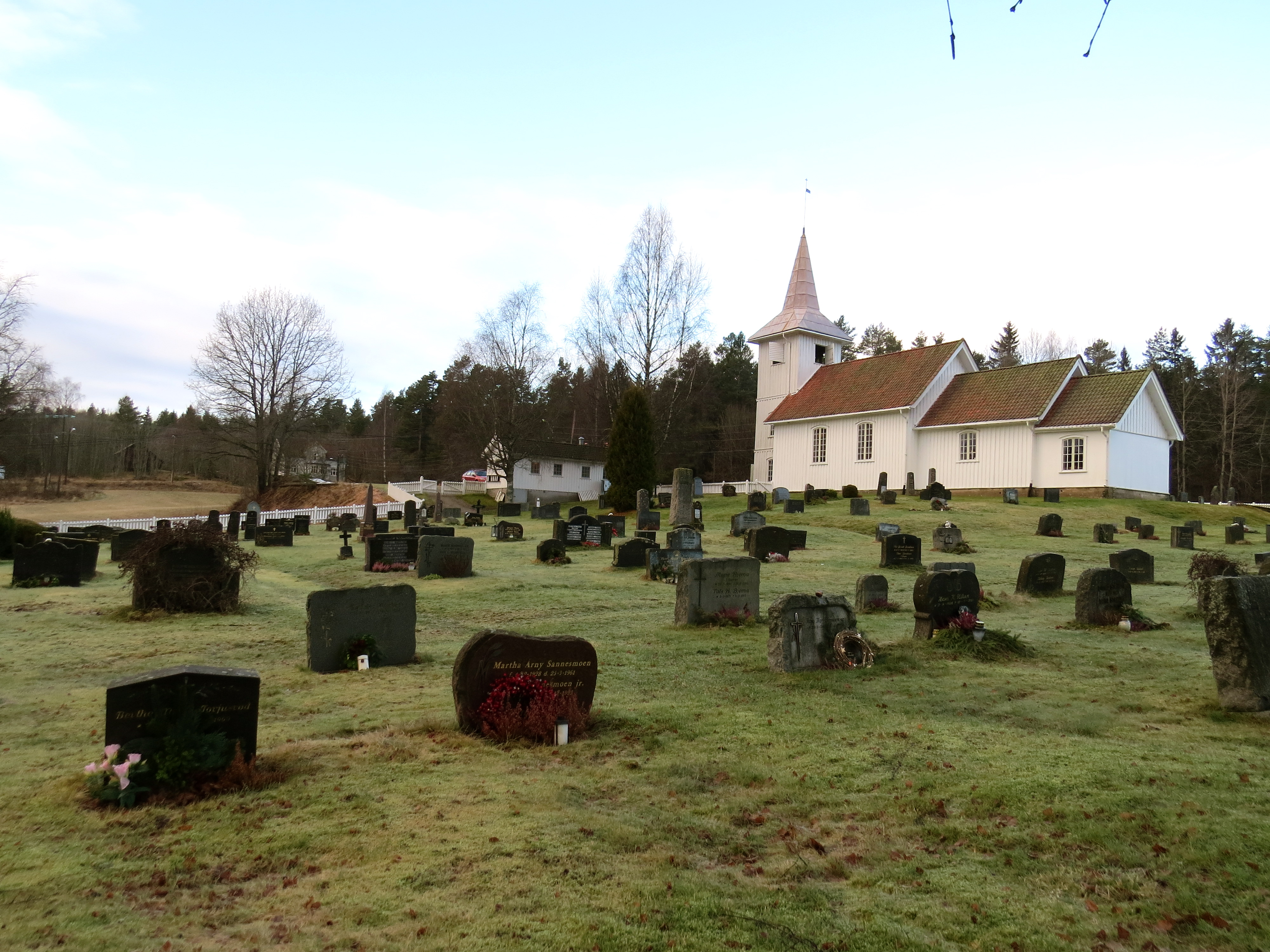
- View of the village church
- Interactive map of Helgja
- Coordinates: 59.25539°N 9.35908°E
- Country: Norway
- Region: Eastern Norway
- County: Telemark
- District: Midt-Telemark
- Municipality: Nome Municipality
- Elevation: 128 m (420 ft)
- Time zone: UTC+01:00 (CET)
  - Summer (DST): UTC+02:00 (CEST)
- Post Code: 3830 Ulefoss

Helgja is a village in Nome Municipality in Telemark county, Norway. The village is located on the west shore of the lake Norsjø, about 5 kilometres (3.1 mi) to the southeast of the village of Ulefoss. Helgen Church is located in the village. The Norwegian National Road 36 runs through the village.
