= Helgen Church =

Church in Telemark, Norway

- Helgen kyrkje
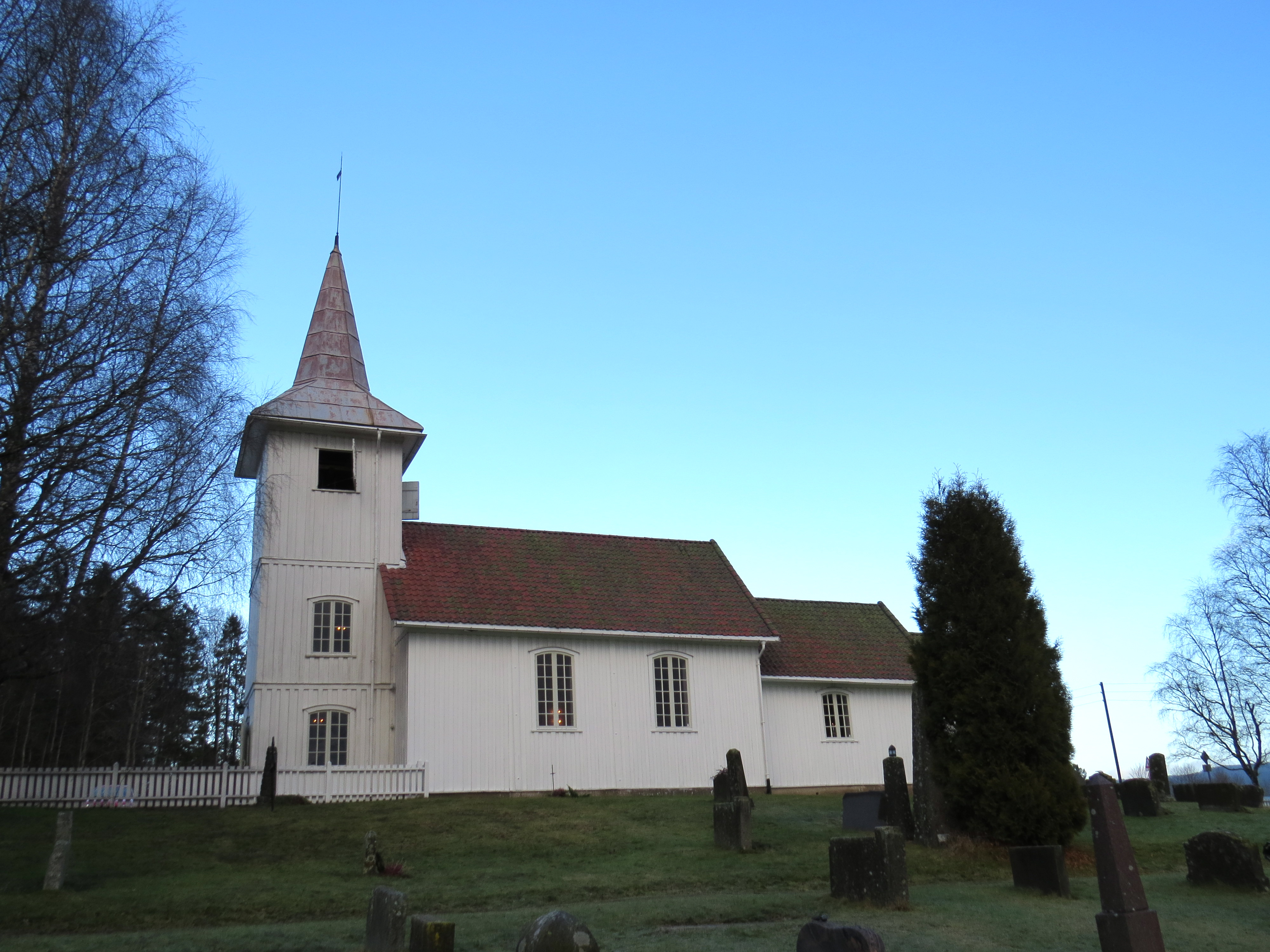
- View of the church
- Helgen Church
- 59°15′14″N 9°21′33″E
- Location: Nome Municipality, Telemark
- Country: Norway
- Denomination: Church of Norway
- Previous denomination: Catholic Church
- Churchmanship: Evangelical Lutheran

History
- Status: Parish church
- Founded: 12th century
- Consecrated: 2 February (year unknown)

Architecture
- Functional status: Active
- Architectural type: Long church
- Completed: 1735 (291 years ago)

Specifications
- Capacity: 110
- Materials: Wood

Administration
- Diocese: Agder og Telemark
- Deanery: Øvre Telemark prosti
- Parish: Holla og Helgen
- Norwegian Cultural Heritage Site
- Type: Church
- Status: Automatically protected
- ID: 84527

Helgen Church (Norwegian: Helgen kyrkje) is a parish church of the Church of Norway in Nome Municipality in Telemark county, Norway. It is located in the village of Helgja. It is one of the churches for the Holla og Helgen parish which is part of the Øvre Telemark prosti (deanery) in the Diocese of Agder og Telemark. The white, wooden church was built in a long church design in 1735 using plans drawn up by an unknown architect. The church seats about 110 people.

== History ==
The earliest existing historical records of the church date back to the year 1398, but the church was not built that year. The first church here was a wooden stave church that was likely built during the 12th century. (During a 1927 archaeological exploration under the church floor, evidence was found to show that the church was built prior to the year 1200.) The church was consecrated on 2 February (year unknown) and dedicated to Saint Olav. Not much is known about the church except that it had a dark interior and had room for about 80 people inside.

After centuries of existence, the church was in poor condition by the early 18th century. In 1723, the church was sold during the Norwegian church sale. In 1734, the church was purchased by Herman Leopoldus, of the Løvenskiold family. The new owner was not happy with the poor condition of the building, so he immediately had the church torn down and a new church was built on the same site during 1734-1735. It was a small, plain building that was described as "a wooden building, which looks more like a stable than a house of worship and is probably the most indecent church in the country." The church had exterior wood paneling that was painted red. Around 1835, the interior of the log building was given wooden paneling which was painted white. In 1867, the municipality purchased the church out of private ownership. In 1868, the church was extensively remodeled and renovated. The small tower on the roof and the old church porch were removed and a new, larger church porch with a bell tower above was added to the main entrance. In 1875, a sacristy was added on the east end of the building using plans by an architect named Bauer. Also the windows and doors were replaced and a new second floor seating gallery was built. In 1927, the floors and foundation were repaired in order to improve drainage around the building. During this work, remains of the old stave church wall were uncovered. They also found graves and coffins dating to the 10th and 11th centuries, which helped date the stave church to being built in the 12th century.

== Media gallery ==
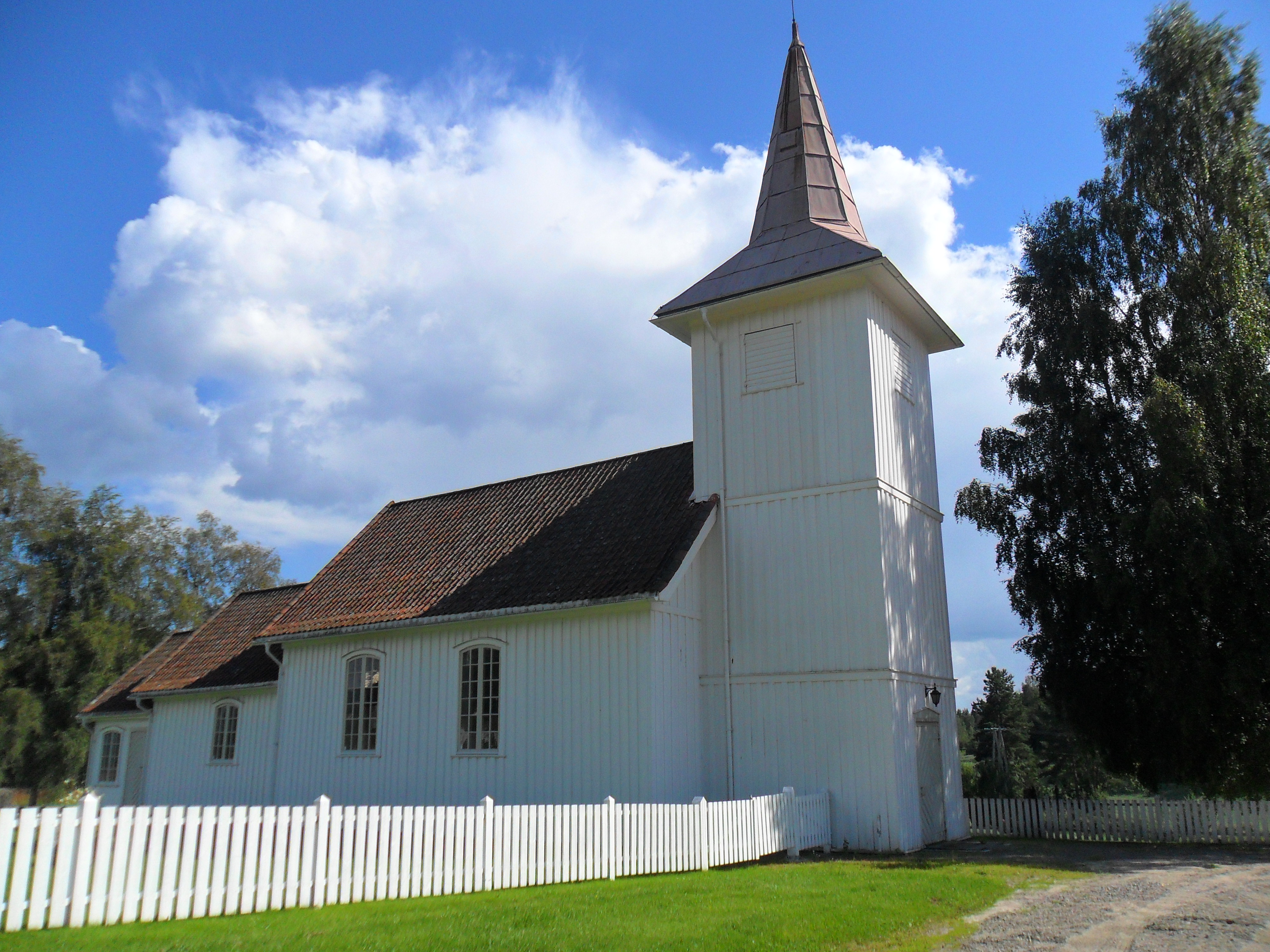

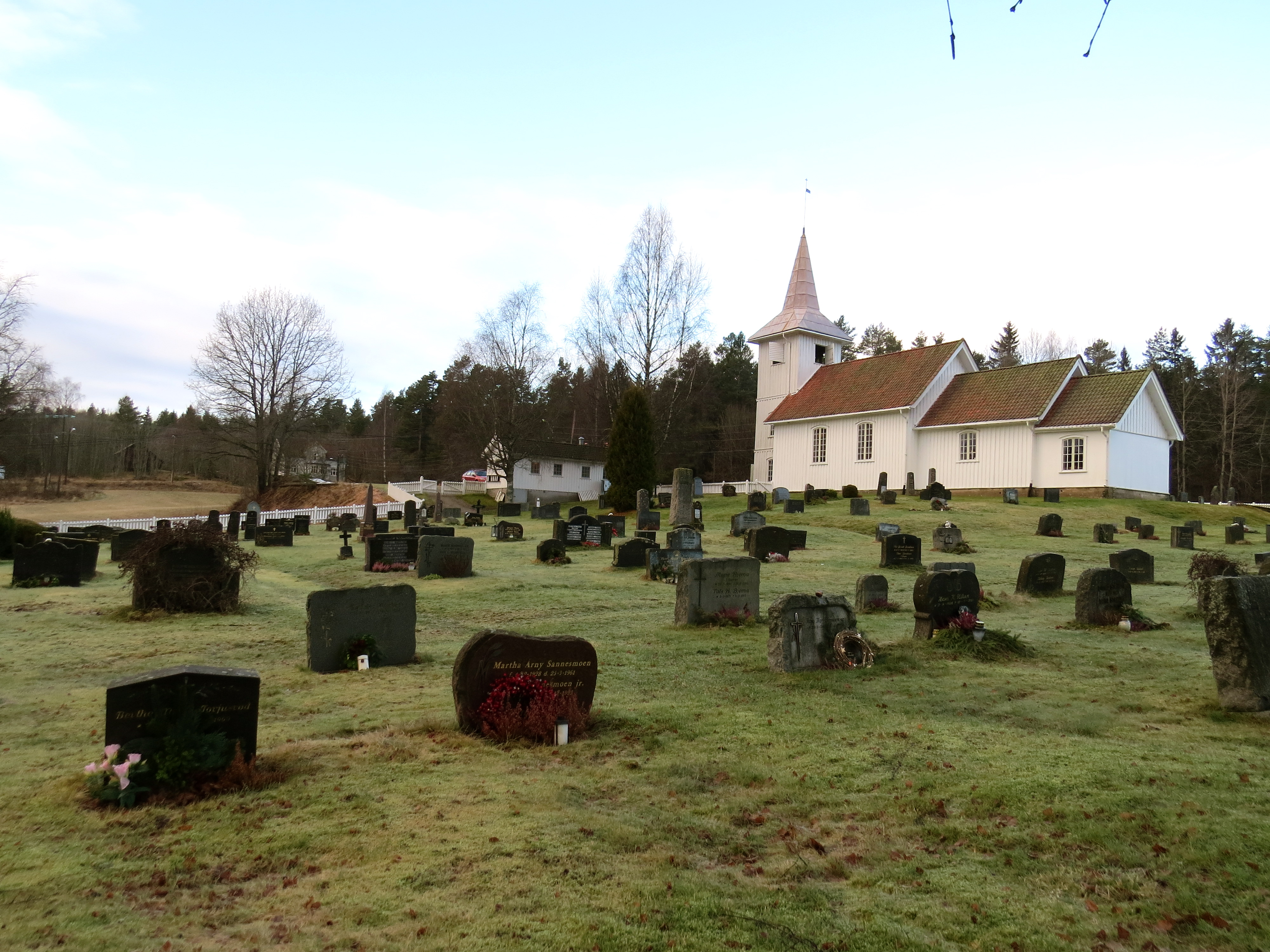

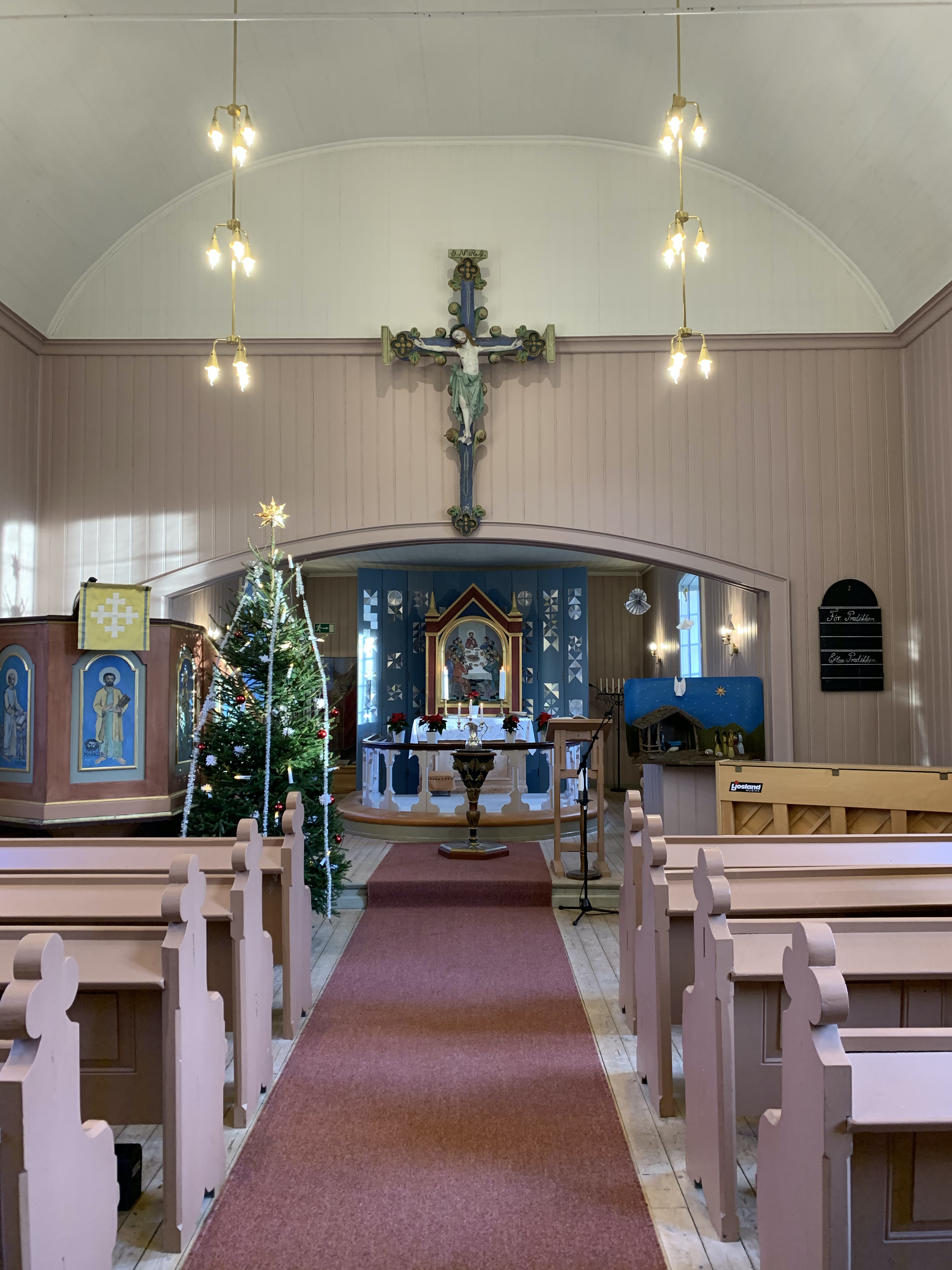

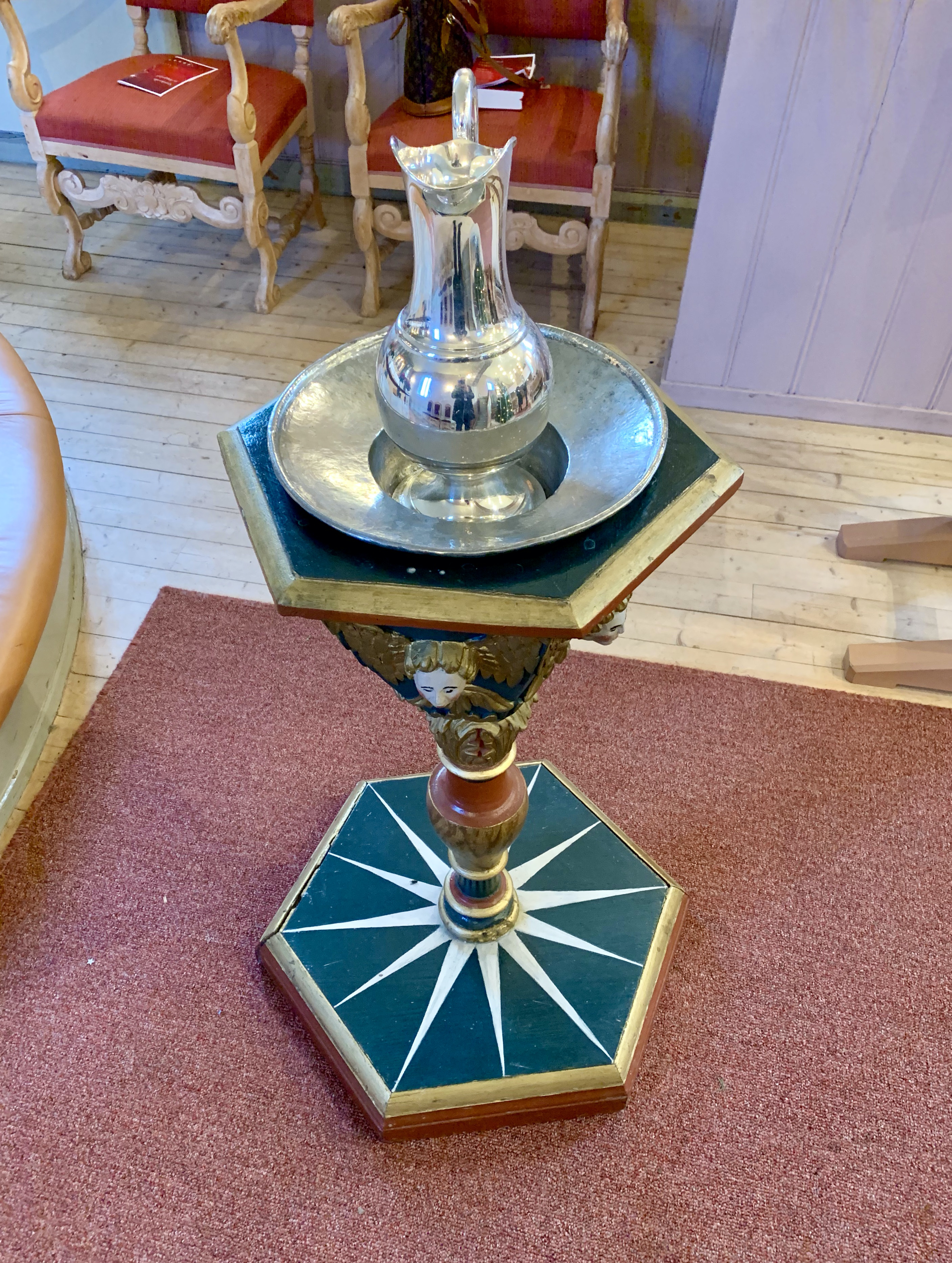

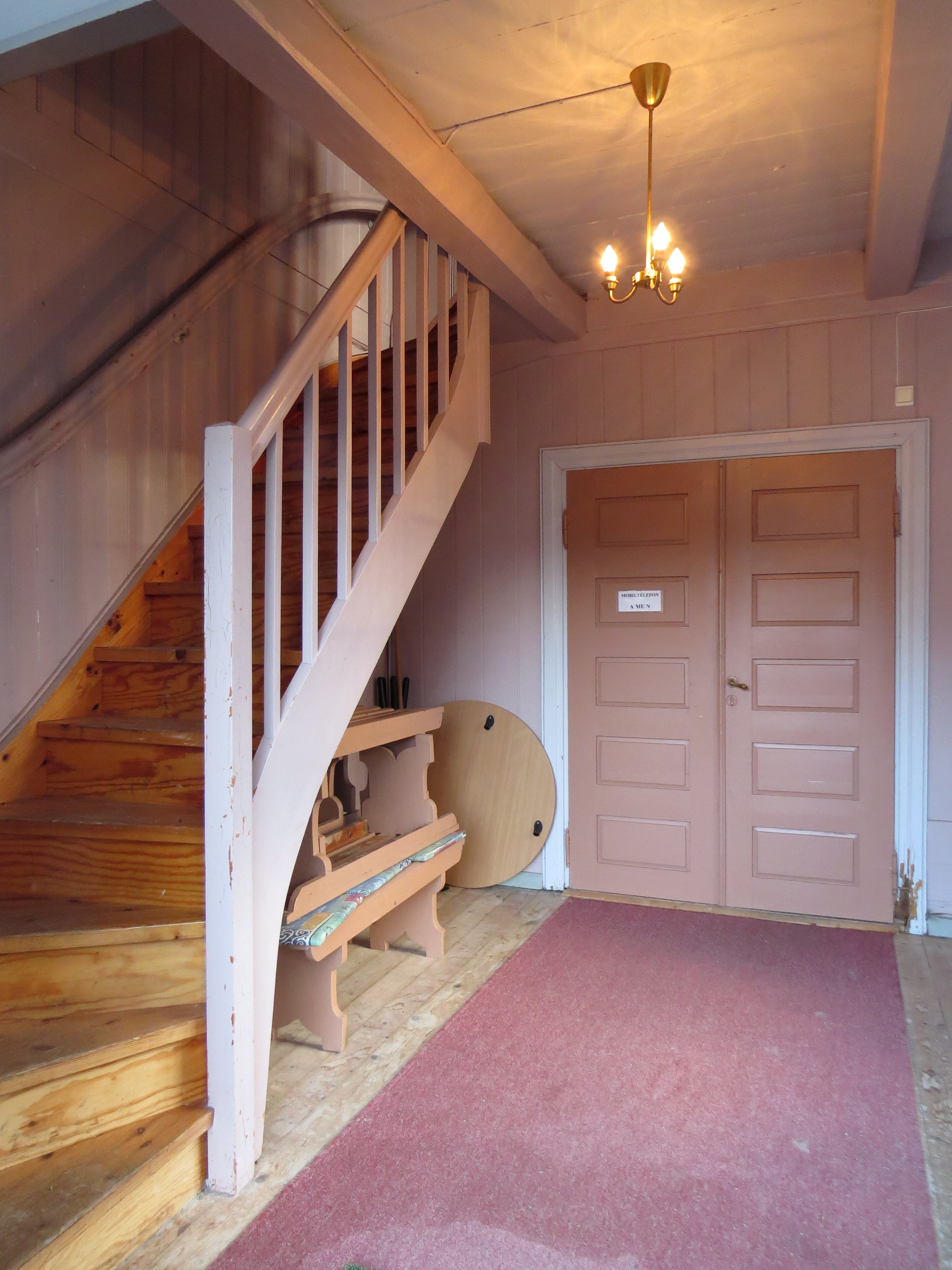

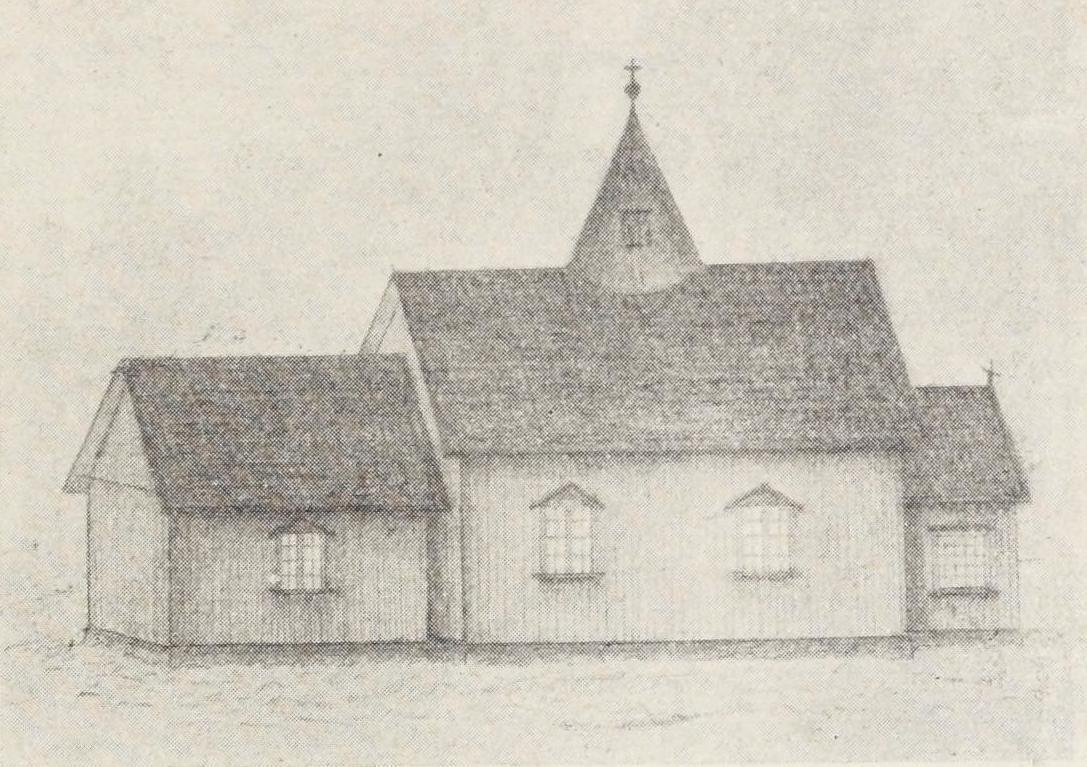
Drawing of the church exterior from before the 1868 renovations

== See also ==
- List of churches in Agder og Telemark
