= Midt-Telemark =

District in Telemark, Norway

Coordinates: 59°24′46″N 9°03′57″E

The Municipalities in Midt-Telemark

Midt-Telemark is a traditional district of Norway situated in Telemark county. It is made up of two municipalities: Midt-Telemark Municipality and Nome Municipality. The largest population centres in the region are Bø, Ulefoss, Bjervamoen, and Gvarv, of which Bø is the largest with 3,609 inhabitants. The district is located between Øvre Telemark (upper Telemark) and Nedre Telemark (lower Telemark).

Historically, the areas of Midt-Telemark included the old parishes of Bø and Sauherad. Both parishes became municipalities on 1 January 1838 when the formannskapsdistrikt law came into effect. Lunde Municipality was split off from Bø Municipality in 1867. In 1964, Lunde Municipality was merged with the neighboring Holla Municipality to form the new Nome Municipality. Holla was never historically part of Midt-Telemark, instead it was often included in the Grenland district.

Leading up to 2020, there were many municipal mergers in Norway, and there was a movement to merge the three municipalities of the Midt-Telemark district. When surveyed whether Bø, Sauherad, and Nome should merge to form one municipality, the percentage who were positive to such a merger were 64% in Sauherad, 59% in Bø, and 48% in Nome. Since a majority of Nome was not in favor, this did not move forward. On 1 January 2020, Bø and Sauherad were merged to form the new Midt-Telemark Municipality. Since then, the district has included the two municipalities of Midt-Telemark and Nome.
