= Torstein Børte =

Norwegian politician

Torstein Børte (6 August 1899 – 7 April 1985) was a Norwegian politician for the Liberal Party.

He served as a deputy representative to the Norwegian Parliament from Telemark during the term 1958–1961.
