= Ulefoss =

Village in Nome Municipality, Norway

- Village
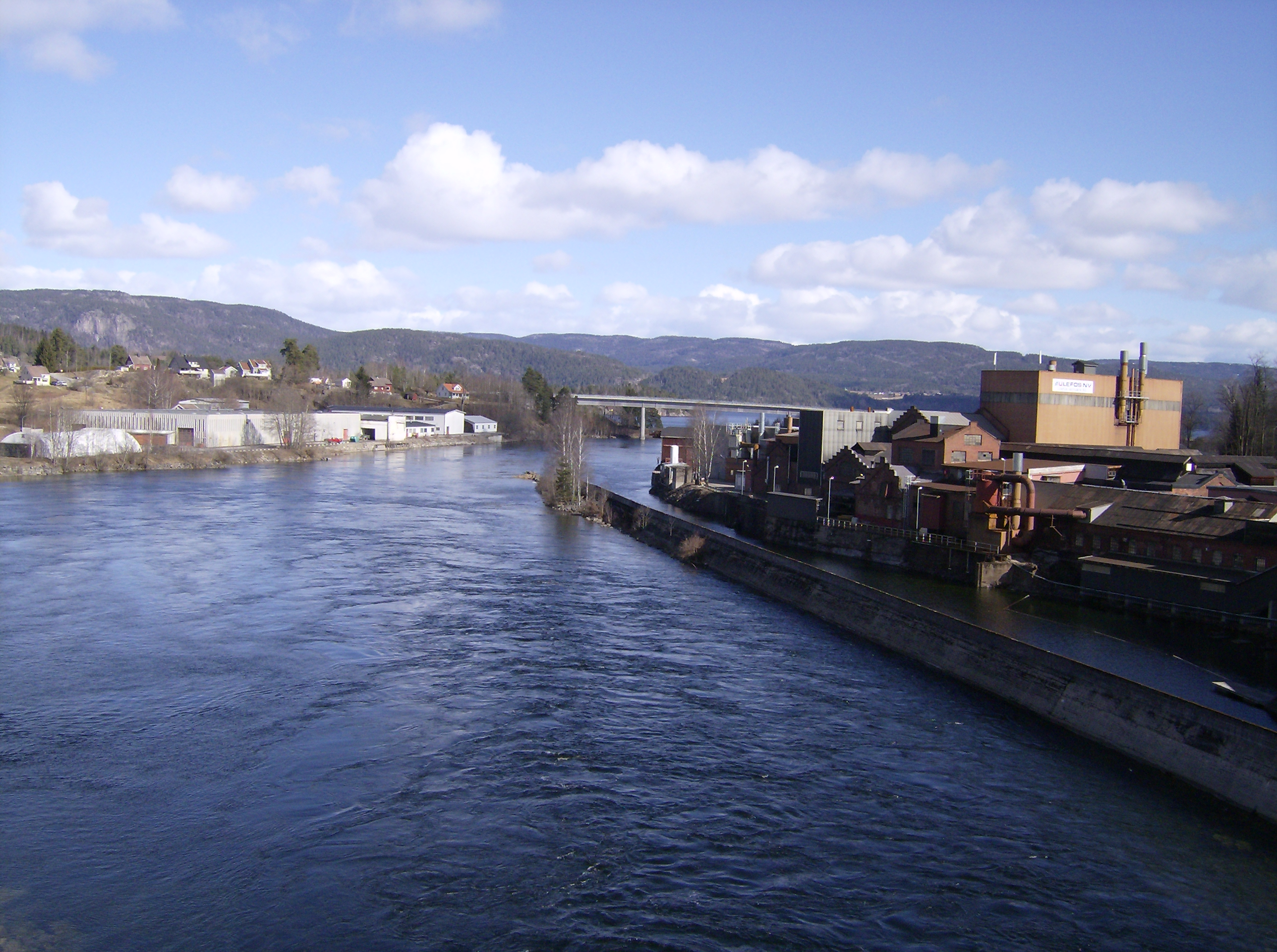
- View of the village
- Interactive map of Ulefoss
- Coordinates: 59.28245°N 9.26547°E
- Country: Norway
- Region: Eastern Norway
- County: Telemark
- District: Midt-Telemark
- Municipality: Nome Municipality

Area
  - Total: 2.56 km^{2} (0.99 sq mi)
- Elevation: 24 m (79 ft)

Population (2025)
  - Total: 2,498
  - Density: 976/km^{2} (2,530/sq mi)
- Time zone: UTC+01:00 (CET)
  - Summer (DST): UTC+02:00 (CEST)
- Post Code: 3830 Ulefoss

Ulefoss is the administrative centre of Nome Municipality in Telemark county, Norway. The village is located along the northwest shore of the large lake Norsjø. The village occupies both sides of Ulefoss falls on the river Eidselva, just before it flows into the lake Norsjø. The village of Helgja lies about 7 kilometres (4.3 mi) to the southeast, the village of Bjervamoen lies about 10 kilometres (6.2 mi) to the west, and the village of Gvarv lies about 13 kilometres (8.1 mi) to the northwest (in Midt-Telemark Municipality).

The 2.56-square-kilometre (630-acre) village has a population (2025) of 2,498 and a population density of 976 inhabitants per square kilometre (2,530/sq mi).

Ulefoss is one of Norway's oldest industrial communities, with sawmills operating from the 1400s, and mining and ironworks from the 1600s. It is still largely an industrial site, with a number of people employed in the iron foundry and mechanical industries.

Ulefoss has primary school, lower secondary, and upper secondary school. A variety of shops and restaurants, a library and culture centre are also located here. Øvre Verket is a group of old workers' dwellings; today a culture and crafts exhibition. Holla Church is located in central Ulefoss and Romnes Church is located on the north side of the village.

The newspaper Kanalen is published in Ulefoss.

== Iron foundry ==
Ulefos Jernværk, an iron foundry located here, was established in 1657 and produced pig iron until 1877. Wood-burning stoves were important products until the 1950s. Hydroelectric power is now used for the melting and production of iron. From 1999 the foundry has been owned by the holding company Ulefos AS.

== Ulefos Hovedgaard ==
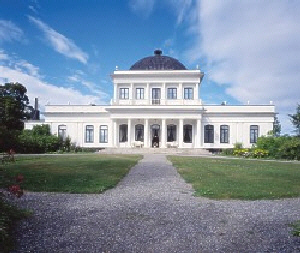
Ulefos Hovedgaard

Ulefos Hovedgaard is an estate developed by merchant, industrialist, and politician Niels Aall as his summer residence. The manor house was completed in 1807 after a construction period of approximately 5 years. The estate is regarded as Norway's finest example of an Empire-style manor house. It was built of slag stone from Ulefos Jærnverk. His son, chamberlain Hans Aall (1805-1863) bought the manor and estate with funds inherited by his wife, the daughter of Diderik von Cappelen who died in 1828. Their descendants still own the surrounding forest properties, while the manor was turned over to a foundation. Today Ulefos Manor is operated by Telemark Museum.
