= Bjervamoen =

Village in Nome Municipality, Norway

Bjervamoen Lunde
- Village
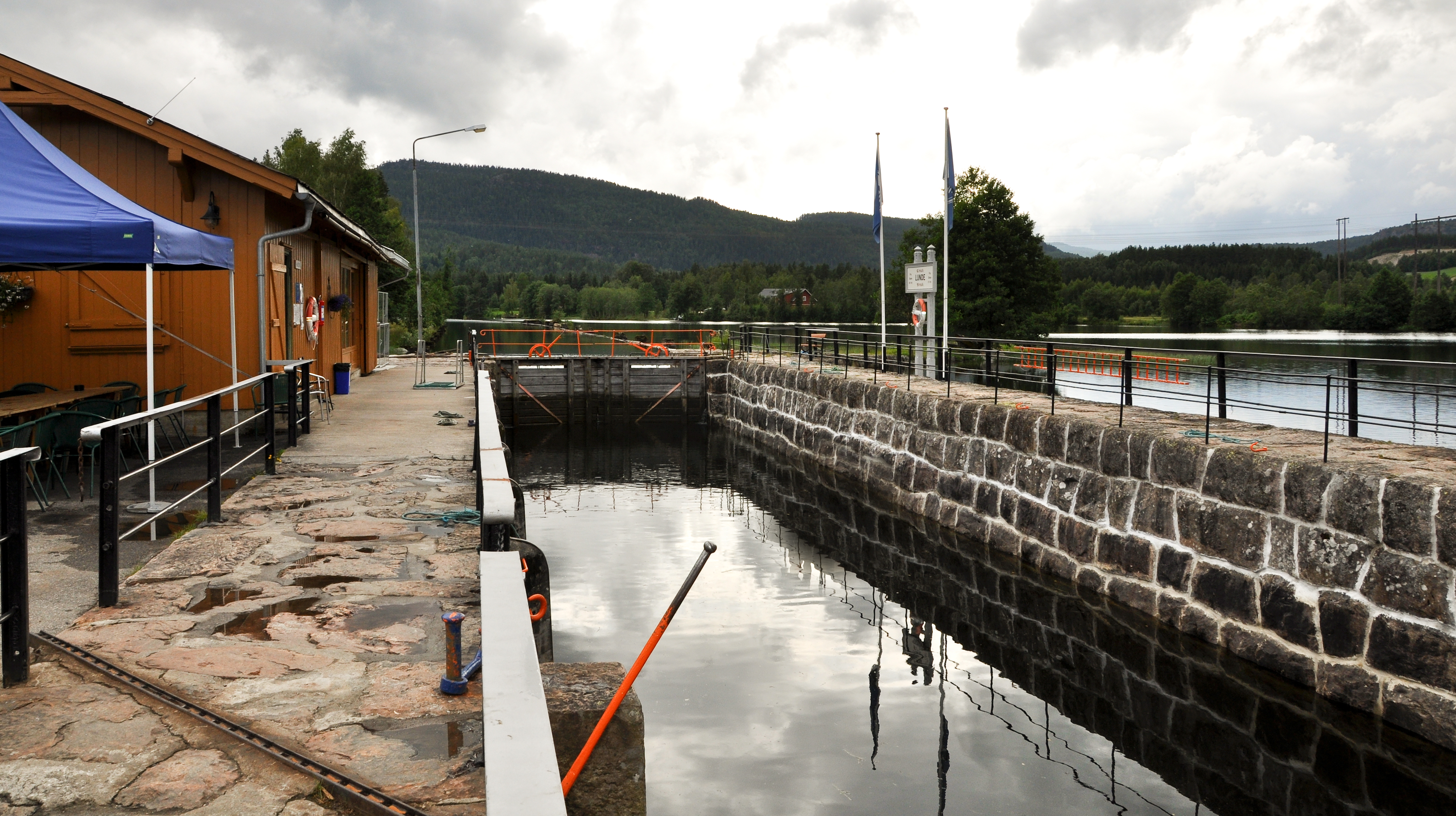
- View of the locks in Bjervamoen
- Interactive map of the village
- Coordinates: 59.29839°N 9.1057°E
- Country: Norway
- Region: Eastern Norway
- County: Telemark
- District: Midt-Telemark
- Municipality: Nome Municipality

Area
  - Total: 1.72 km^{2} (0.66 sq mi)
- Elevation: 78 m (256 ft)

Population (2025)
  - Total: 1,565
  - Density: 910/km^{2} (2,400/sq mi)
- Time zone: UTC+01:00 (CET)
  - Summer (DST): UTC+02:00 (CEST)
- Post Code: 3825 Lunde

Bjervamoen or Lunde is a village in Nome Municipality in Telemark county, Norway. The village is located along the river Straumen, about 10 kilometres (6.2 mi) west of the village of Ulefoss, about 10 kilometres (6.2 mi) east of Flåbygd, and about 15 kilometres (9.3 mi) south of Bø i Telemark. The village is located along the Telemark Canal and the Sørlandsbanen railway line. Lunde Church is located in the village.

The 1.72-square-kilometre (430-acre) village has a population (2025) of 1,565 and a population density of 910 inhabitants per square kilometre (2,400/sq mi).

== History ==
The village was the administrative centre of the old Lunde Municipality which existed until 1964. Since then, the village area has also been known as "Lunde".
