= Lunde Church (Telemark) =

Church in Telemark, Norway

- Lunde kirke
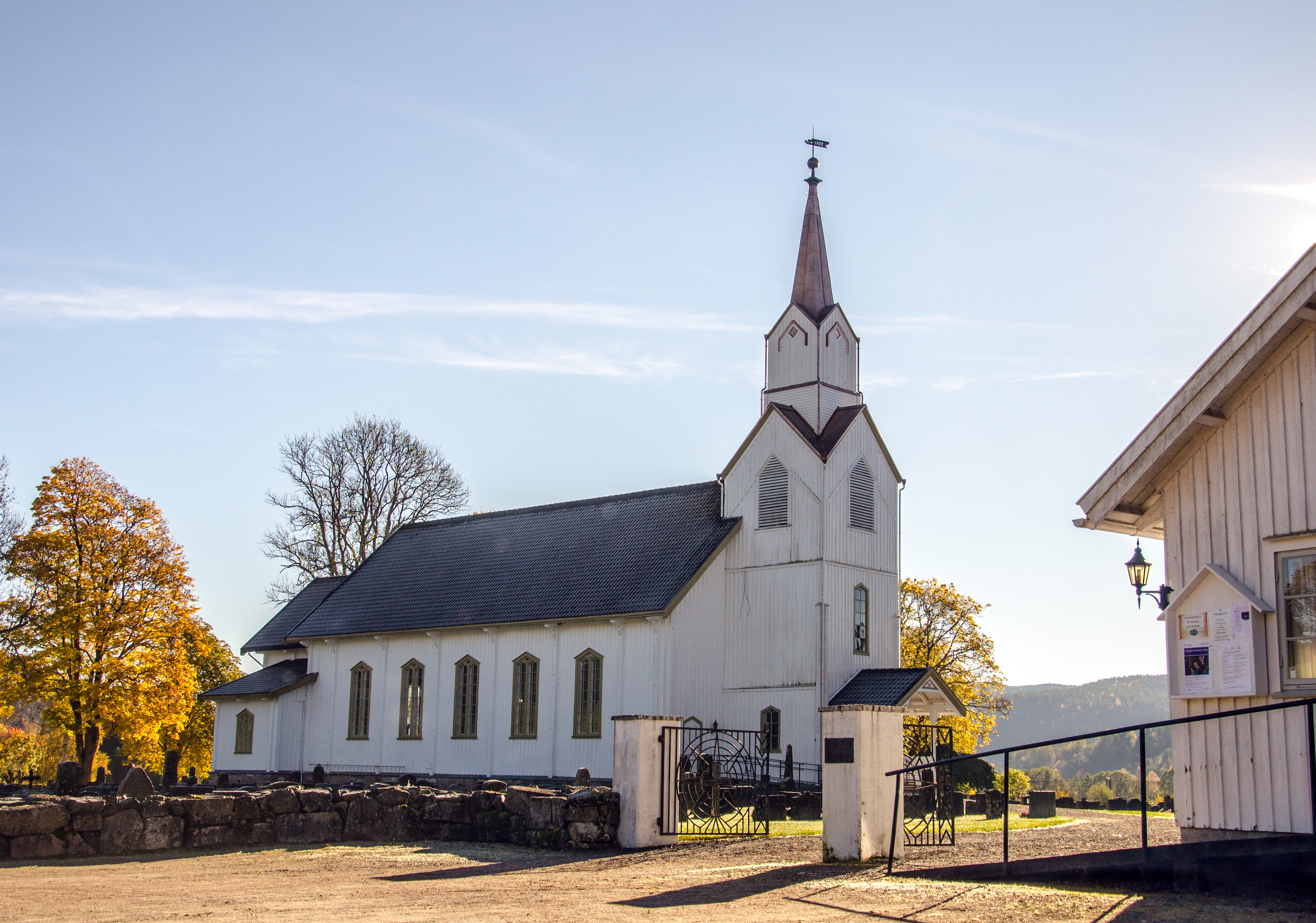
- View of the church
- Lunde Church
- 59°18′21″N 9°06′51″E
- Location: Nome Municipality, Telemark
- Country: Norway
- Denomination: Church of Norway
- Previous denomination: Catholic Church
- Churchmanship: Evangelical Lutheran

History
- Status: Parish church
- Founded: 12th century
- Consecrated: 9 August 1872

Architecture
- Functional status: Active
- Architect: Jacob Wilhelm Nordan
- Architectural type: Long church
- Completed: 1872 (154 years ago)

Specifications
- Capacity: 450
- Materials: Wood

Administration
- Diocese: Agder og Telemark
- Deanery: Øvre Telemark prosti
- Parish: Lunde og Flåbygd
- Norwegian Cultural Heritage Site
- Type: Church
- Status: Not protected
- ID: 84337

Lunde Church (Norwegian: Lunde kirke) is a parish church of the Church of Norway in Nome Municipality in Telemark county, Norway. It is located in the village of Bjervamoen. It is one of the churches in the Lunde og Flåbygd parish which is part of the Øvre Telemark prosti (deanery) in the Diocese of Agder og Telemark. The white, wooden church was built in a long church design in 1872 using plans drawn up by the architect Jacob Wilhelm Nordan. The church seats about 450 people.

== History ==
The earliest existing historical records of the church date back to the year 1398, but the church was not built that year. The first church in Lunde was a stone long church that was built in the middle of the 12th century. It is said that the church looked a lot like the Old Bø Church, but with a more Norman style. The church was dedicated to John the Baptist. The church was said to have a nave that measured 13.5 metres (44 ft) long and the chancel measured 6.3 by 6.3 metres (21 ft × 21 ft). In the middle of the 19th century, the old church is said to have had room for 280 people, which was too small for the congregation. Also, the church was cold and drafty. In 1860, the church was purchased by the congregation and it was decided to demolish the old church and replace it with a new building. The last service was held in the old church on 17 August 1870. The church was then torn down and work on a new church on the same site began. Some of the stone from the old church was reused in the construction of the new building.

The new church building was designed by Jacob Wilhelm Nordan and a man named G.A. Hansen was hired as the lead builder. The new church was a wooden long church with a tower on the west with a church porch beneath it. The choir is on the east end of the nave and a sacristy on the north side of the choir. The new building was consecrated on 9 August 1872. In 1873, structural work was done inside the church to prevent the exterior walls from bowing outwards. The tower was repaired in 1920–1921 and the church was refurbished in the 1960s. The church was refurbished again for its 125th anniversary in 1997. In the spring of 2015, tower was repaired once again.

== Media gallery ==
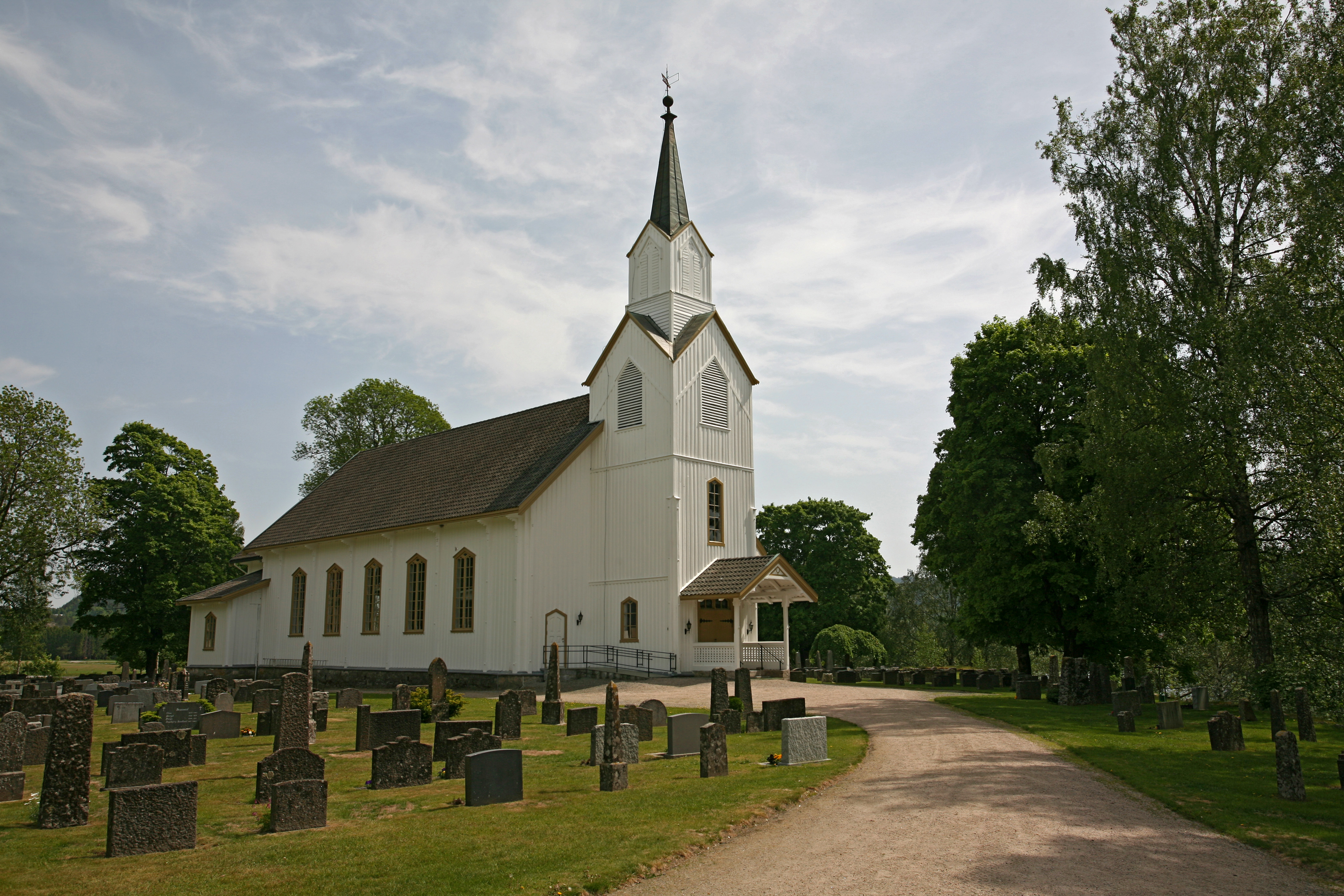

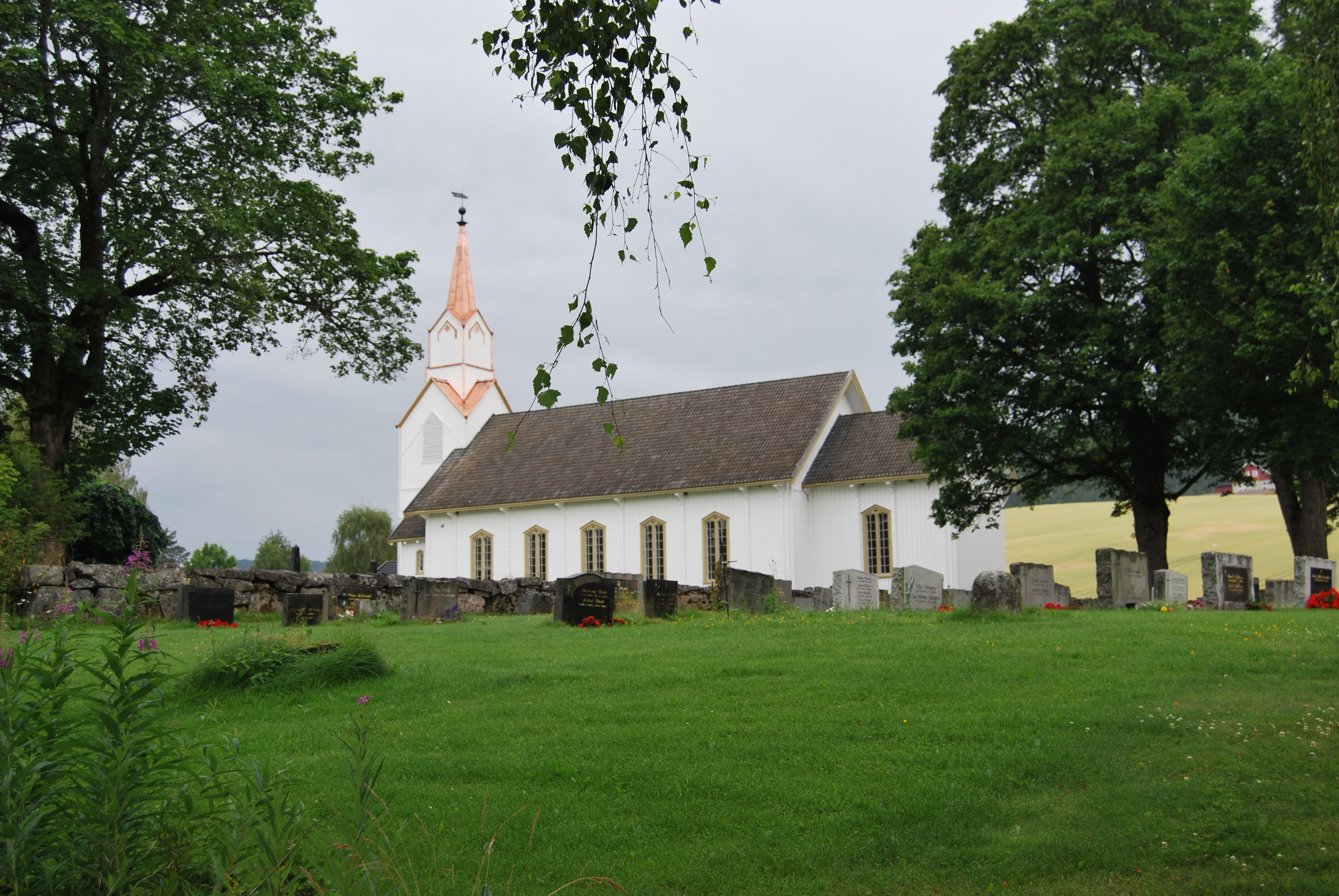

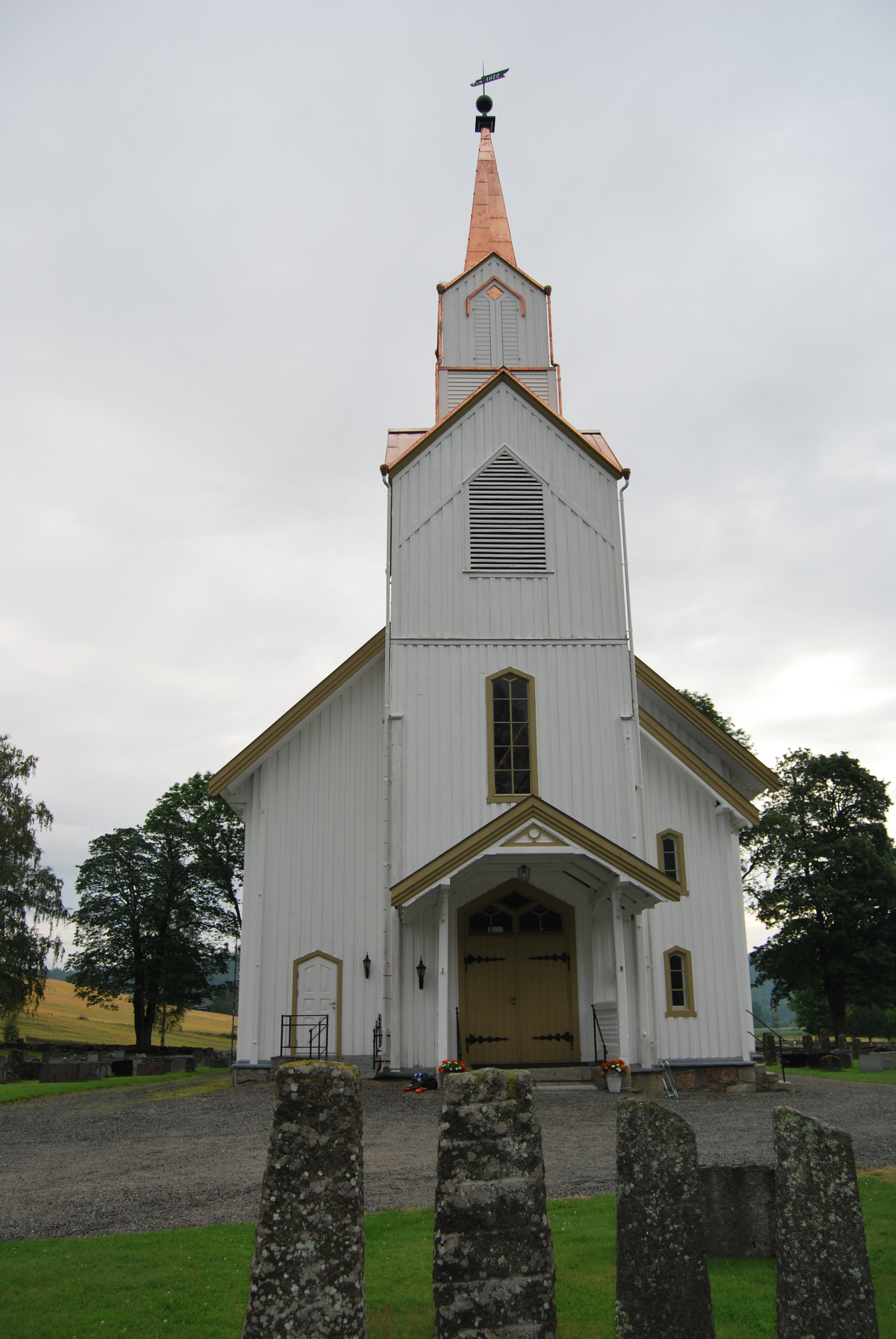

== See also ==
- List of churches in Agder og Telemark
