= Skien Municipality =

Municipality in Telemark, Norway

Skien Municipality Skien kommune
- Municipality
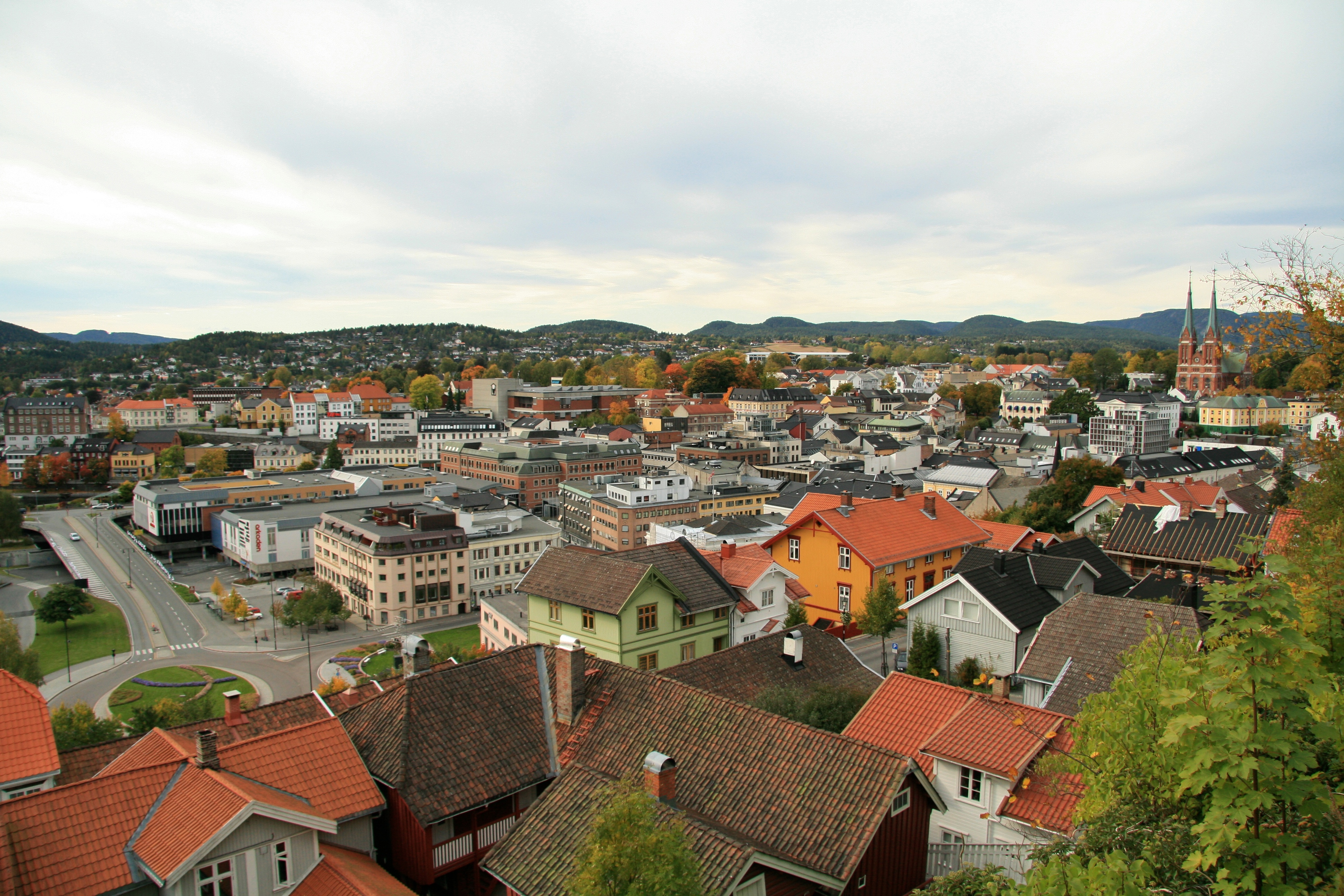
- View of the city centre

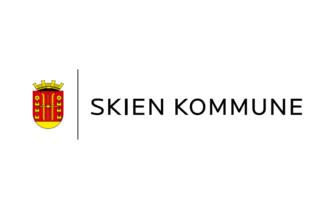
- Flag Coat of arms

- Telemark within Norway

- Skien within Telemark
- Coordinates: 59°12′29″N 9°33′10″E
- Country: Norway
- County: Telemark
- District: Grenland
- Established: 1 Jan 1838
  - Created as: Formannskapsdistrikt
- Administrative centre: Skien

Government
  - Mayor (2023): Marius Roheim Aarvold (H)

Area
  - Total: 779.2 km^{2} (300.9 sq mi)
  - Land: 718.98 km^{2} (277.60 sq mi)
  - Water: 60.22 km^{2} (23.25 sq mi) 7.7%
  - Rank: #147 in Norway
- Highest elevation (Skåråfjell): 812.62 m (2,666.1 ft)

Population (2026)
  - Total: 56,906
  - Rank: #18 in Norway
  - Density: 79.1/km^{2} (205/sq mi)
  - Change (10 years): ▲ +5.5%
- Demonym(s): Skiensmann (male); Skienskvinne (female); Skiensfolk

Official language
  - Norwegian form: Neutral
- Time zone: UTC+01:00 (CET)
  - Summer (DST): UTC+02:00 (CEST)
- ISO 3166 code: NO-4003
- Website: Official website

Skien (Norwegian: [ˈʂêːən]; locally [ˈʂêːæɳ]) is a municipality in Telemark county, Norway. It is located in the traditional district of Grenland, although historically it belonged to Grenmar/Skiensfjorden, while Grenland referred the Norsjø area and Bø. The administrative centre of the municipality is the city of Skien, which is also the administrative centre of the whole county. Some of the notable villages in the municipality include Åfoss, Hoppestad, Klovholt, Luksefjell, Melum, Kilebygda, Skotfoss, Sneltvedt, and Valebø.

The 779.2-square-kilometre (300.9 sq mi) municipality is the 147th largest by area out of the 357 municipalities in Norway. Skien Municipality is the 18th most populous municipality in Norway with a population of 56,906. The municipality's population density is 79.1 inhabitants per square kilometre (205/sq mi) and its population has increased by 5.5% over the previous 10-year period. The conurbation of Porsgrunn/Skien is reckoned by Statistics Norway to be the seventh largest urban area in Norway, straddling an area of three municipalities: Skien municipality (about 62% of the population), Porsgrunn Municipality (30%), and Bamble Municipality (8%). This entire area is home to more than 100,000 people.

The municipality has existed since 1838, but the city of Skien is one of Norway's oldest cities, with an urban history dating back to the Middle Ages, and received privileges as a market town (kjøpstad) in 1358. From the 15th century, the city was governed by a 12-member council. Skien was historically a centre of seafaring, timber exports, and early industrialization. It was one of Norway's two or three largest cities between the 16th and 19th centuries. It was also one of Norway's most internationally oriented cities, with extensive contact with its export markets in the Low Countries, the United Kingdom, and Denmark. It retained its position as Eastern Norway's leading commercial city until the 19th century, when it gradually started to lose importance to the emerging capital of Christiania following the Napoleonic Wars. The city was the birthplace of playwright Henrik Ibsen, and many of his famous dramas are set in places reminiscent of early 19th-century Skien.

== General information ==
=== Administrative history ===
The formannskapsdistrikt law of 1837 created a system of local government in Norway by establishing each town (ladested or kjøpstad) and each Church of Norway prestegjeld as a civil municipality. On 1 January 1838, the kjøpstad of Skien was established as Skien Municipality.

On 1 January 1856, an area of the neighboring Gjerpen Municipality (population: 1,286) was annexed into Skien Municipality. Again, on 1 July 1916, another area of Gjerpen Municipality (population: 1,332) and an area of Solum Municipality (population: 1,042) were transferred into Skien Municipality.

During the 1960s, there were many municipal mergers across Norway due to the work of the Schei Committee. On 1 January 1964, the following areas were merged to form an enlarged Skien Municipality:

- all of Skien Municipality (population: 15,805)
- all of Gjerpen Municipality (population: 15,300)
- all of Solum Municipality (population: 13,706)
- the Valebø area of Holla Municipality (population: 259)

In 2020, there were many municipal and county mergers across Norway due to the work of the Solberg cabinet. Historically, this municipality was part of Telemark county. On 1 January 2020, the municipality became a part of the newly-formed Vestfold og Telemark county (after Telemark and Vestfold counties were merged). The merger was shortlived, and on 1 January 2024, the merger was undone and this municipality became part of Telemark county once again.

=== Name ===
The municipality (originally the town of Skien) is named after the Skien river (Old Norse: Skiða) since it ran through the town. The name is the plural genitive case of the word skið which means "ski", likely referring to the straight path of the river.

=== Coat of arms ===
The coat of arms is derived from the oldest known seal of the city, dating back to 1609. The blazon is "Gules, two crossed ski-poles with central star between two skis addorsed between two flower plants issuant from a terrace in base Or". This means the arms have a red field (background) and the charge is a two ski poles forming a cross with a star at the crosspoint located in between two skis which in turn are between two tall flower plants growing out of a flat ground at the bottom of the shield. A mural crown is usually displayed above the shield. The charge has a tincture of Or which means it is commonly colored yellow, but if it is made out of metal, then gold is used. The skis are a semi-canting element (based on the meaning of the town's name) and the cross is a religious symbol. There have been several theories about the meaning of the cross, but its meaning is not clearly known. It has been suggested that it is a symbol for the main church in Skien, the Holy Cross church. The small star may be a symbol of St. Mary as the second medieval church of Skien was devoted to her. Besides the skis and cross, there are two meadow buttercups on each side. The municipal flag is white with a small image of coat of arms next to the name "Skien kommune".

In 1854, the arms were shown as two skis, but the cross was now made from ski poles, as another canting element. This remained so until the early half of the 20th century. In the 1980s, the city officially adopted the current arms, which are identical to the oldest seal. The colours are the colours that have been used since the 19th century. The differences between the seal and the present arms are that in the arms the cross is placed on top of the skis and the star is changed from a four-pointed star to a six-pointed star, and that the cross is made of ski-poles.

== History ==
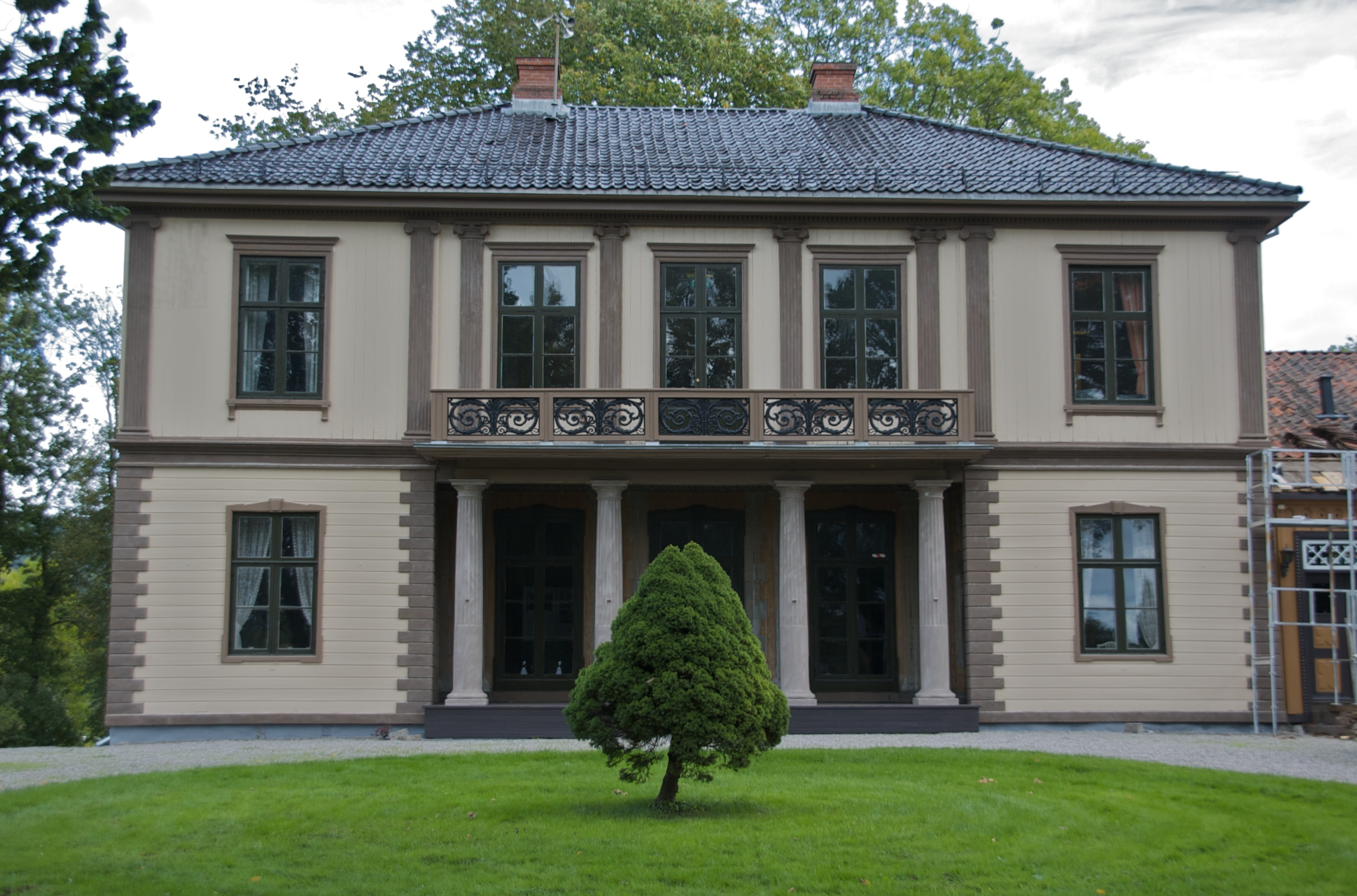
Frogner Manor in Skien

Until 1979, it was thought that Skien was founded in the 14th century. However, the archaeological discovery of a carving of the Skien animal has established that its founding preceded 1000 A.D. The city was then a meeting place for inland farmers and marine traders, and also a centre for trading whetstones from Eidsborg (inland Telemark). Gimsøy Abbey was founded in the 12th century. Skien was given formal commercial town rights by the Norwegian crown in 1358. Timber has historically been the principal export from Skien, and in the sixteenth century the city became the Kingdom's leading port for shipping timber. The oldest remaining building is Gjerpen Church (built in approximately 1150).

From the 16th century, the city came to be dominated by a group of families known as patricians. In an 1882 letter to Georg Brandes, Henrik Ibsen mentions the families Paus, Plesner, von der Lippe, Cappelen and Blom as the most prominent patrician families when he grew up there. The current town layout was fixed after the last town fire in 1886.

== Geography ==
The highest point in the municipality is the 812.62-metre (2,666.1 ft) tall mountain Skåråfjell. Kongsberg Municipality (in Buskerud county) is located to the north, Siljan Municipality is located to the northeast, Porsgrunn Municipality is located to the east, Bamble Municipality is located to the south, Drangedal Municipality is located to the southwest, Nome Municipality is located to the west, and Midt-Telemark Municipality is located to the northwest.

=== Climate ===
Climate data for Gjerpen - Århus 1991–2020 (41 m, avg high/low 2013–2025)
Month	Jan	Feb	Mar	Apr	May	Jun	Jul	Aug	Sep	Oct	Nov	Dec	Year
Mean daily maximum °C (°F)	1.4 (34.5)	3.5 (38.3)	7 (45)	12.1 (53.8)	17.2 (63.0)	21.2 (70.2)	22.9 (73.2)	21.3 (70.3)	17.8 (64.0)	11.5 (52.7)	5.4 (41.7)	2 (36)	11.9 (53.6)
Daily mean °C (°F)	−2.6 (27.3)	−1.9 (28.6)	1.3 (34.3)	5.8 (42.4)	11.1 (52.0)	15.1 (59.2)	17.2 (63.0)	15.8 (60.4)	12.1 (53.8)	6.6 (43.9)	1.9 (35.4)	−2.0 (28.4)	6.7 (44.1)
Mean daily minimum °C (°F)	−5 (23)	−4.1 (24.6)	−2.4 (27.7)	0.8 (33.4)	5.9 (42.6)	10.1 (50.2)	11.9 (53.4)	10.6 (51.1)	8.3 (46.9)	3.7 (38.7)	−0.4 (31.3)	−4.3 (24.3)	2.9 (37.3)
Average precipitation mm (inches)	64.0 (2.52)	52.0 (2.05)	43.0 (1.69)	50.0 (1.97)	76.0 (2.99)	84.0 (3.31)	76.0 (2.99)	102.0 (4.02)	88.0 (3.46)	109.0 (4.29)	93.0 (3.66)	65.0 (2.56)	902.0 (35.51)
Source: yr.no (mean, precipitation)

== Government ==
Skien Municipality is responsible for primary education (through 10th grade), outpatient health services, senior citizen services, welfare and other social services, zoning, economic development, and municipal roads and utilities. The municipality is governed by a municipal council of directly elected representatives. The mayor is indirectly elected by a vote of the municipal council. The municipality is under the jurisdiction of the Nedre Telemark District Court and the Agder Court of Appeal.

=== Municipal council ===
The municipal council (Kommunestyre) of Skien Municipality is made up of 55 representatives that are elected to four-year terms. The tables below show the current and historical composition of the council by political party.

Skien kommunestyre 2023–2027
Party name (in Norwegian)	Number of representatives
Labour Party (Arbeiderpartiet)	13
Progress Party (Fremskrittspartiet)	9
Green Party (Miljøpartiet De Grønne)	2
Conservative Party (Høyre)	13
Industry and Business Party (Industri‑ og Næringspartiet)	3
Christian Democratic Party (Kristelig Folkeparti)	3
Norway Democrats (Norgesdemokratene)	1
Red Party (Rødt)	3
Centre Party (Senterpartiet)	3
Socialist Left Party (Sosialistisk Venstreparti)	4
Liberal Party (Venstre)	1
Total number of members:	55

Skien kommunestyre 2019–2023
Party name (in Norwegian)	Number of representatives
Labour Party (Arbeiderpartiet)	18
People's Action No to More Road Tolls (Folkeaksjonen nei til mer bompenger)	1
Progress Party (Fremskrittspartiet)	5
Green Party (Miljøpartiet De Grønne)	3
Conservative Party (Høyre)	10
Christian Democratic Party (Kristelig Folkeparti)	3
Red Party (Rødt)	3
Centre Party (Senterpartiet)	6
Socialist Left Party (Sosialistisk Venstreparti)	3
Liberal Party (Venstre)	1
City party (Bypartiet)	2
Total number of members:	55

Skien kommunestyre 2015–2019
Party name (in Norwegian)	Number of representatives
Labour Party (Arbeiderpartiet)	19
Progress Party (Fremskrittspartiet)	6
Green Party (Miljøpartiet De Grønne)	2
Conservative Party (Høyre)	9
Christian Democratic Party (Kristelig Folkeparti)	4
Red Party (Rødt)	1
Centre Party (Senterpartiet)	2
Socialist Left Party (Sosialistisk Venstreparti)	2
Liberal Party (Venstre)	2
City party (Bypartiet)	8
Total number of members:	55

Skien kommunestyre 2011–2015
Party name (in Norwegian)	Number of representatives
Labour Party (Arbeiderpartiet)	21
Progress Party (Fremskrittspartiet)	7
Conservative Party (Høyre)	15
Christian Democratic Party (Kristelig Folkeparti)	4
Red Party (Rødt)	1
Centre Party (Senterpartiet)	1
Socialist Left Party (Sosialistisk Venstreparti)	3
Liberal Party (Venstre)	3
Total number of members:	55

Skien kommunestyre 2007–2011
Party name (in Norwegian)	Number of representatives
Labour Party (Arbeiderpartiet)	21
Progress Party (Fremskrittspartiet)	14
Conservative Party (Høyre)	6
Christian Democratic Party (Kristelig Folkeparti)	5
Red Electoral Alliance (Rød Valgallianse)	1
Centre Party (Senterpartiet)	1
Socialist Left Party (Sosialistisk Venstreparti)	4
Liberal Party (Venstre)	3
Total number of members:	55

Skien kommunestyre 2003–2007
Party name (in Norwegian)	Number of representatives
Labour Party (Arbeiderpartiet)	18
Progress Party (Fremskrittspartiet)	11
Conservative Party (Høyre)	5
Christian Democratic Party (Kristelig Folkeparti)	4
Centre Party (Senterpartiet)	2
Socialist Left Party (Sosialistisk Venstreparti)	8
Liberal Party (Venstre)	1
Total number of members:	49

Skien kommunestyre 1999–2003
Party name (in Norwegian)	Number of representatives
Labour Party (Arbeiderpartiet)	17
Progress Party (Fremskrittspartiet)	9
Conservative Party (Høyre)	8
Christian Democratic Party (Kristelig Folkeparti)	6
Red Electoral Alliance (Rød Valgallianse)	1
Centre Party (Senterpartiet)	1
Socialist Left Party (Sosialistisk Venstreparti)	5
Liberal Party (Venstre)	2
Total number of members:	49

Skien kommunestyre 1995–1999
Party name (in Norwegian)	Number of representatives
Labour Party (Arbeiderpartiet)	23
Progress Party (Fremskrittspartiet)	11
Conservative Party (Høyre)	11
Christian Democratic Party (Kristelig Folkeparti)	7
Pensioners' Party (Pensjonistpartiet)	5
Red Electoral Alliance (Rød Valgallianse)	1
Centre Party (Senterpartiet)	4
Socialist Left Party (Sosialistisk Venstreparti)	5
Liberal Party (Venstre)	2
Total number of members:	69

Skien kommunestyre 1991–1995
Party name (in Norwegian)	Number of representatives
Labour Party (Arbeiderpartiet)	21
Progress Party (Fremskrittspartiet)	5
Conservative Party (Høyre)	14
Christian Democratic Party (Kristelig Folkeparti)	8
Red Electoral Alliance (Rød Valgallianse)	1
Centre Party (Senterpartiet)	6
Socialist Left Party (Sosialistisk Venstreparti)	12
Liberal Party (Venstre)	2
Total number of members:	69

Skien kommunestyre 1987–1991
Party name (in Norwegian)	Number of representatives
Labour Party (Arbeiderpartiet)	29
Progress Party (Fremskrittspartiet)	9
Conservative Party (Høyre)	16
Christian Democratic Party (Kristelig Folkeparti)	6
Centre Party (Senterpartiet)	1
Socialist Left Party (Sosialistisk Venstreparti)	5
Liberal Party (Venstre)	3
Total number of members:	69

Skien kommunestyre 1983–1987
Party name (in Norwegian)	Number of representatives
Labour Party (Arbeiderpartiet)	34
Progress Party (Fremskrittspartiet)	3
Conservative Party (Høyre)	18
Christian Democratic Party (Kristelig Folkeparti)	7
Centre Party (Senterpartiet)	1
Socialist Left Party (Sosialistisk Venstreparti)	4
Liberal Party (Venstre)	2
Total number of members:	69

Skien kommunestyre 1979–1983
Party name (in Norwegian)	Number of representatives
Labour Party (Arbeiderpartiet)	34
Progress Party (Fremskrittspartiet)	1
Conservative Party (Høyre)	20
Christian Democratic Party (Kristelig Folkeparti)	11
Centre Party (Senterpartiet)	3
Socialist Left Party (Sosialistisk Venstreparti)	4
Liberal Party (Venstre)	4
Total number of members:	77

Skien kommunestyre 1975–1979
Party name (in Norwegian)	Number of representatives
Labour Party (Arbeiderpartiet)	33
Anders Lange's Party (Anders Langes parti)	1
Conservative Party (Høyre)	14
Christian Democratic Party (Kristelig Folkeparti)	13
New People's Party (Nye Folkepartiet)	2
Centre Party (Senterpartiet)	4
Socialist Left Party (Sosialistisk Venstreparti)	7
Liberal Party (Venstre)	3
Total number of members:	77

Skien kommunestyre 1971–1975
Party name (in Norwegian)	Number of representatives
Labour Party (Arbeiderpartiet)	37
Conservative Party (Høyre)	11
Christian Democratic Party (Kristelig Folkeparti)	8
Centre Party (Senterpartiet)	4
Socialist People's Party (Sosialistisk Folkeparti)	6
Liberal Party (Venstre)	8
Socialist common list (Venstresosialistiske felleslister)	3
Total number of members:	77

Skien kommunestyre 1967–1971
Party name (in Norwegian)	Number of representatives
Labour Party (Arbeiderpartiet)	39
Conservative Party (Høyre)	10
Communist Party (Kommunistiske Parti)	1
Christian Democratic Party (Kristelig Folkeparti)	6
Centre Party (Senterpartiet)	3
Socialist People's Party (Sosialistisk Folkeparti)	8
Liberal Party (Venstre)	10
Total number of members:	77

Skien kommunestyre 1963–1967
Party name (in Norwegian)	Number of representatives
Labour Party (Arbeiderpartiet)	42
Conservative Party (Høyre)	10
Communist Party (Kommunistiske Parti)	2
Christian Democratic Party (Kristelig Folkeparti)	6
Centre Party (Senterpartiet)	2
Socialist People's Party (Sosialistisk Folkeparti)	5
Liberal Party (Venstre)	10
Total number of members:	77
Note: On 1 January 1964, Gjerpen Municipality, Solum Municipality, and a small part of Holla Municipality were merged into Skien Municipality.

Skien bystyre 1959–1963
Party name (in Norwegian)	Number of representatives
Labour Party (Arbeiderpartiet)	30
Conservative Party (Høyre)	12
Communist Party (Kommunistiske Parti)	4
Christian Democratic Party (Kristelig Folkeparti)	6
Liberal Party (Venstre)	9
Total number of members:	61

Skien bystyre 1955–1959
Party name (in Norwegian)	Number of representatives
Labour Party (Arbeiderpartiet)	29
Conservative Party (Høyre)	11
Communist Party (Kommunistiske Parti)	6
Christian Democratic Party (Kristelig Folkeparti)	6
Liberal Party (Venstre)	9
Total number of members:	61

Skien bystyre 1951–1955
Party name (in Norwegian)	Number of representatives
Labour Party (Arbeiderpartiet)	26
Conservative Party (Høyre)	10
Communist Party (Kommunistiske Parti)	6
Christian Democratic Party (Kristelig Folkeparti)	5
Liberal Party (Venstre)	13
Total number of members:	60

Skien bystyre 1947–1951
Party name (in Norwegian)	Number of representatives
Labour Party (Arbeiderpartiet)	17
Conservative Party (Høyre)	8
Communist Party (Kommunistiske Parti)	9
Christian Democratic Party (Kristelig Folkeparti)	4
Joint list of the Liberal Party (Venstre) and the Radical People's Party (Radikale Folkepartiet)	14
Total number of members:	52

Skien bystyre 1945–1947
Party name (in Norwegian)	Number of representatives
Labour Party (Arbeiderpartiet)	19
Conservative Party (Høyre)	6
Communist Party (Kommunistiske Parti)	12
Christian Democratic Party (Kristelig Folkeparti)	6
Liberal Party (Venstre)	9
Total number of members:	52

Skien bystyre 1937–1940*
Party name (in Norwegian)	Number of representatives
Labour Party (Arbeiderpartiet)	24
Conservative Party (Høyre)	11
Communist Party (Kommunistiske Parti)	4
Liberal Party (Venstre)	21
Total number of members:	60
Note: Due to the German occupation of Norway during World War II, no elections were held for new municipal councils until after the war ended in 1945.

Skien bystyre 1934–1937
Party name (in Norwegian)	Number of representatives
Labour Party (Arbeiderpartiet)	23
Free-minded People's Party (Frisinnede Folkeparti)	5
Conservative Party (Høyre)	10
Communist Party (Kommunistiske Parti)	5
Liberal Party (Venstre)	17
Total number of members:	60

Skien bystyre 1931–1934
Party name (in Norwegian)	Number of representatives
Labour Party (Arbeiderpartiet)	17
Communist Party (Kommunistiske Parti)	8
Liberal Party (Venstre)	18
Joint list of the Conservative Party (Høyre) and the Free-minded People's Party (Frisinnede Folkeparti)	15
Joint List(s) of Non-Socialist Parties (Borgerlige Felleslister)	2
Total number of members:	60

Skien bystyre 1928–1931
Party name (in Norwegian)	Number of representatives
Labour Party (Arbeiderpartiet)	17
Free-minded Liberal Party (Frisinnede Venstre)	7
Conservative Party (Høyre)	10
Communist Party (Kommunistiske Parti)	10
Liberal Party (Venstre)	16
Total number of members:	60

Skien bystyre 1925–1928
Party name (in Norwegian)	Number of representatives
Labour Party (Arbeiderpartiet)	3
Temperance Party (Avholdspartiet)	6
Conservative Party (Høyre)	13
Social Democratic Labour Party (Socialdemokratiske Arbeiderparti)	7
Joint list of the Conservative Party (Høyre) and the Free-minded Liberal Party (Frisinnede Venstre)	8
Joint list of the Liberal Party (Venstre) and the Labour Democrats (Arbeiderdemokratene)	7
Workers' Common List (Arbeidernes fellesliste)	16
Total number of members:	60

Skien bystyre 1922–1925
Party name (in Norwegian)	Number of representatives
Labour Party (Arbeiderpartiet)	19
Temperance Party (Avholdspartiet)	10
Labour Democrats (Arbeiderdemokratene)	1
Social Democratic Labour Party (Socialdemokratiske Arbeiderparti)	5
Liberal Party (Venstre)	4
Joint list of the Conservative Party (Høyre) and the Free-minded Liberal Party (Frisinnede Venstre)	21
Total number of members:	60

Skien bystyre 1919–1922
Party name (in Norwegian)	Number of representatives
Labour Party (Arbeiderpartiet)	18
Free-minded Liberal Party (Frisinnede Venstre)	6
Conservative Party (Høyre)	16
Liberal Party (Venstre)	5
Joint list of the Temperance Party (Avholdspartiet) and the Labour Democrats (Arbeiderdemokratene)	7
Total number of members:	52

=== Mayors ===
The mayor (Norwegian: ordfører) of Skien Municipality is the political leader of the municipality and the chairperson of the municipal council. The following people have held this position:

- 1838–1838: Christopher Myhre
- 1838–1840: Peter Fredrik Feilberg
- 1840–1842: Hans Severin Arentz
- 1842–1843: Hother Bøttger
- 1844–1845: Cornelius Blom
- 1845–1847: Hans Severin Arentz
- 1847–1848: Herman Bagger
- 1848–1850: Hans Severin Arentz
- 1850–1851: Herman Bagger
- 1851–1860: Hans Severin Arentz
- 1860–1861: Herman Bagger
- 1861–1867: Hans Severin Arentz
- 1867–1869: Herman Bagger
- 1869–1872: Hans Julius Hammer
- 1872–1873: Anthon H. Steenstrup
- 1873–1876: Hans Severin Arentz
- 1876–1878: Johan Castberg (V)
- 1878–1879: Hans Dulin (V)
- 1879–1881: Johan R. Garben
- 1881–1883: Hans Dulin (V)
- 1883–1886: Axel Borchgrevink (H)
- 1886–1887: Martin Walther (H)
- 1887–1893: Paul Steenstrup Koht (V)
- 1893–1896: Hans Gurstad (V)
- 1896–1897: Hans Larsen (V)
- 1897–1899: Carl Stousland (V)
- 1899–1905: Tholf Grini (V)
- 1905–1909: Søren B. Paulsen (V)
- 1909–1910: Tholf Grini (V)
- 1910–1911: Johannes Sørfonden (V)
- 1911–1912: Harald Kristoffersen (V)
- 1912–1914: Tholf Grini (FV)
- 1914–1917: Jonas P. Solheim (V)
- 1917–1919: Carl Stousland (V)
- 1919–1920: Tholf Grini (FV)
- 1920–1926: Lars Skjelbred (H)
- 1926–1927: Hermann Olaus Hansen (NKP)
- 1927–1928: Christian C. Bruun (H)
- 1928–1929: Jørgen Bøhle (H)
- 1929–1931: Carl Hartmann (V)
- 1932–1935: Jørgen Bøhle (H)
- 1931–1932: K. Slagstad (V)
- 1935–1937: Ambros Sollid (V)
- 1938–1941: Øivind Stensrud (V)
- 1945–1945: Øivind Stensrud (V)
- 1945–1947: Hermann Olaus Hansen (Ap)
- 1948–1952: Aslak Nilsen (Ap)
- 1952–1964: Arnt Haraldsen (Ap)
- 1964–1967: Johan Heisholt (Ap)
- 1967–1980: Sigurd Namløs (Ap)
- 1980–1984: Halvor Aas (H)
- 1984–1986: Einfrid Halvorsen (Ap)
- 1986–1987: Per Sigurd Lauvstad (Ap)
- 1988-1988: Einfrid Halvorsen (Ap)
- 1988–1989: Audun Kleppe (KrF)
- 1990–1993: Per Sigurd Lauvstad (Ap)
- 1993–1993: Rolf Erling Andersen (Ap)
- 1994–1995: Audun Kleppe (KrF)
- 1995–1999: Rolf Erling Andersen (Ap)
- 1999–2001: Kari Lise Holmberg (H)
- 2001–2003: Jan Terje Olsen (H)
- 2003–2011: Rolf Erling Andersen (Ap)
- 2011–2023: Hedda Foss Five (Ap)
- 2023–present: Marius Roheim Aarvold (H)
- 2024 (Feb 1–May 15): Jørn Inge Næss (FrP), Acting Mayor

== Transportation ==
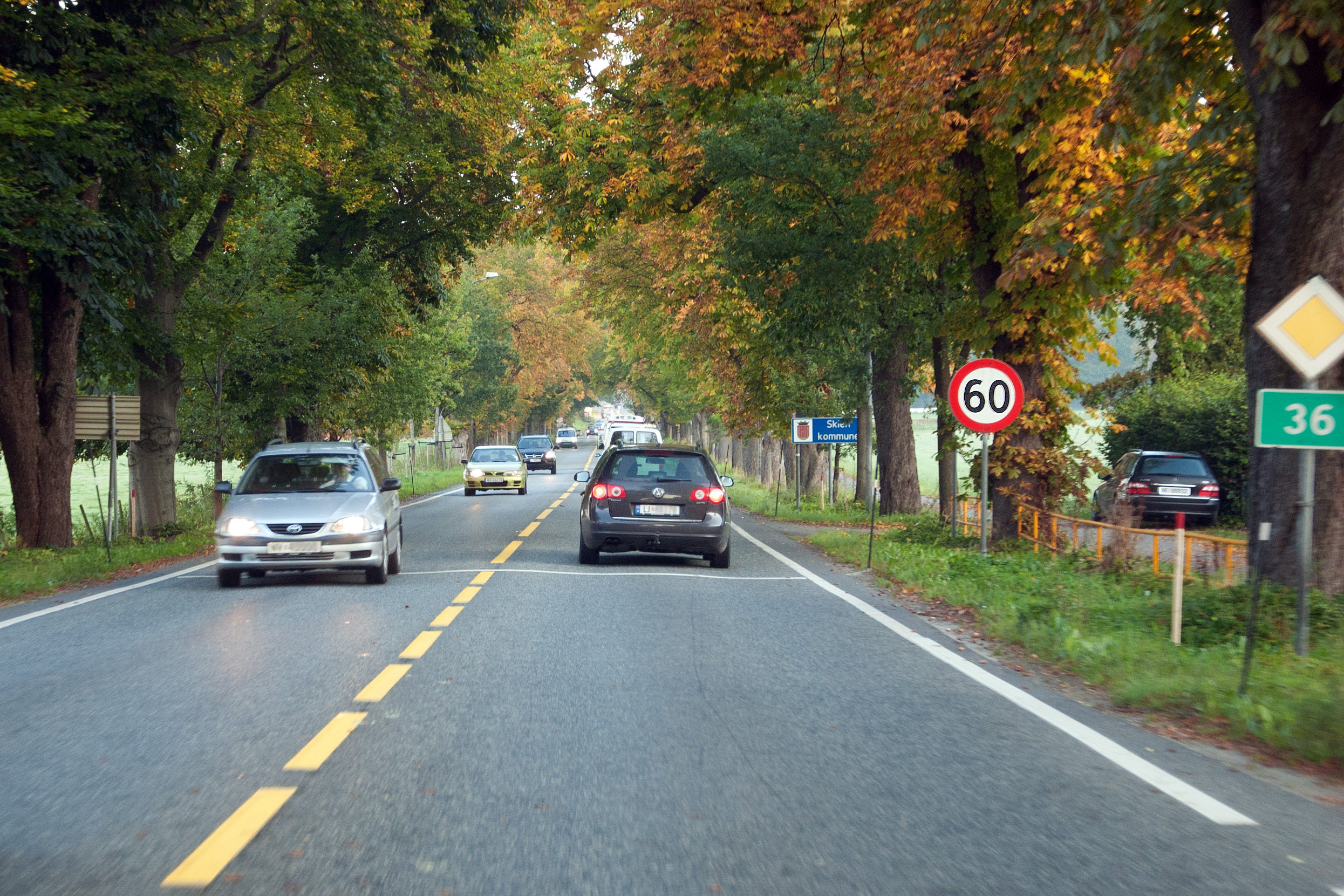
Riksvei 36: Gunnar Knudsens Veg

=== Roads ===
The European route E18 highway runs through neighboring Porsgrunn and it connects to the Norwegian national road 36 which is the main road through Skien. It follows along the Skienselva river to the north. Another main route used by most buses coming from Oslo is Norwegian county road 32 which goes through Siljan and on to the northeast.

=== Water ===
Skien is the main terminus for the Telemark Canal. The "Norsjø-Skienskanalen" section of the canal, with one terminus at Skien and the other at Løveid, was built in 1854–1861. In Europe, canals were commonly built in the pre-railroad period to transport goods, timber, and passengers. The "Porsgrunn river" runs from the lock at Skien through Porsgrunn to the Frierfjord. Skien harbour is located at Vold havneterminal.

=== Railroads ===
Skien was connected to the Norwegian railway network (Vestfoldbanen) in 1882. In 1919, Bratsbergbanen railway line opened between Skien and Notodden. Vy still operates regular train services on both railways.

=== Air ===
The local airport was Skien Airport, Geiteryggen. It served domestic flights to Bergen and Stavanger as well as flights to Trondheim by the airline Vildanden. For the present, no commercial flights are operated from Geiteryggen.

== Culture and recreation ==
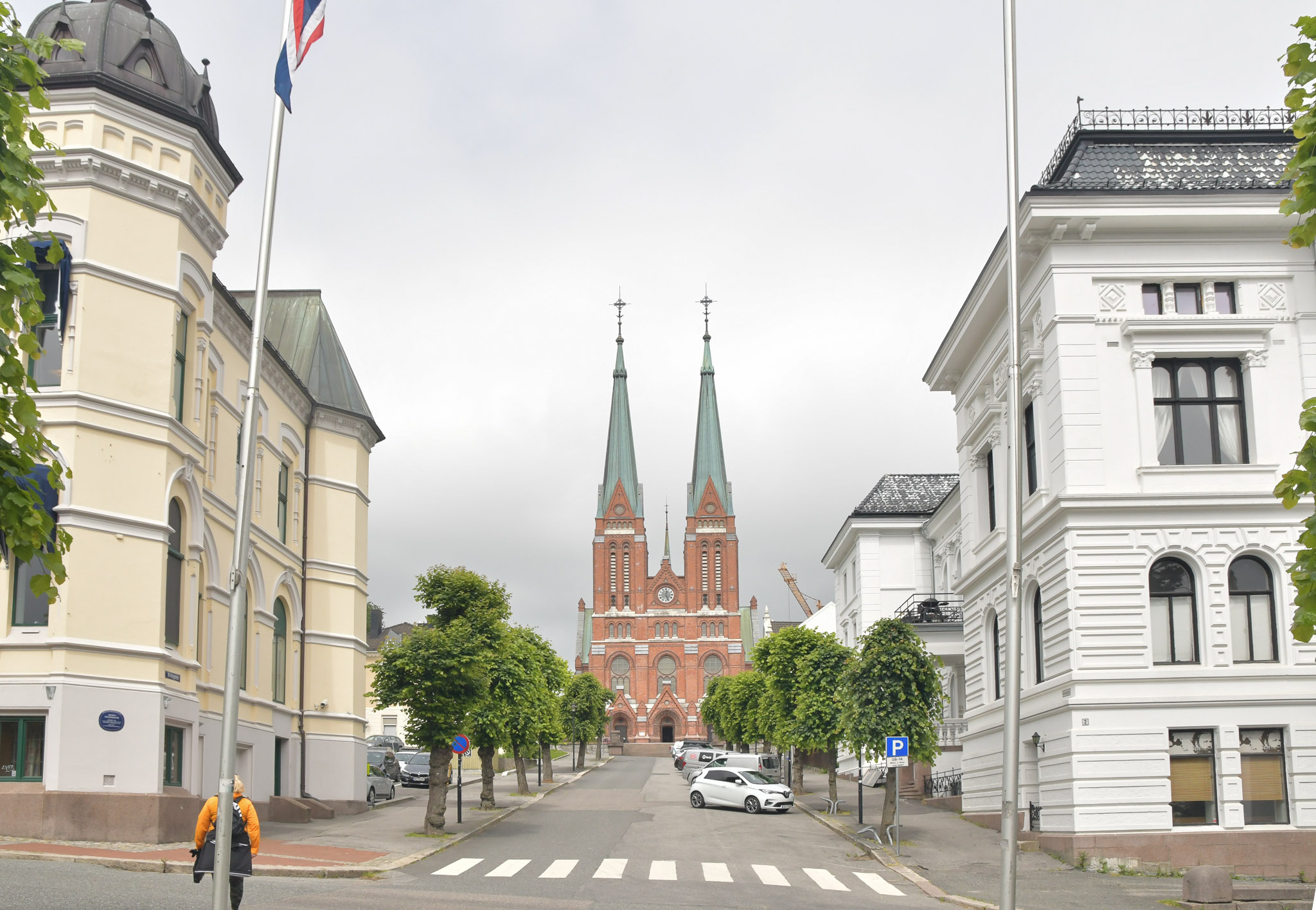
Skien Church

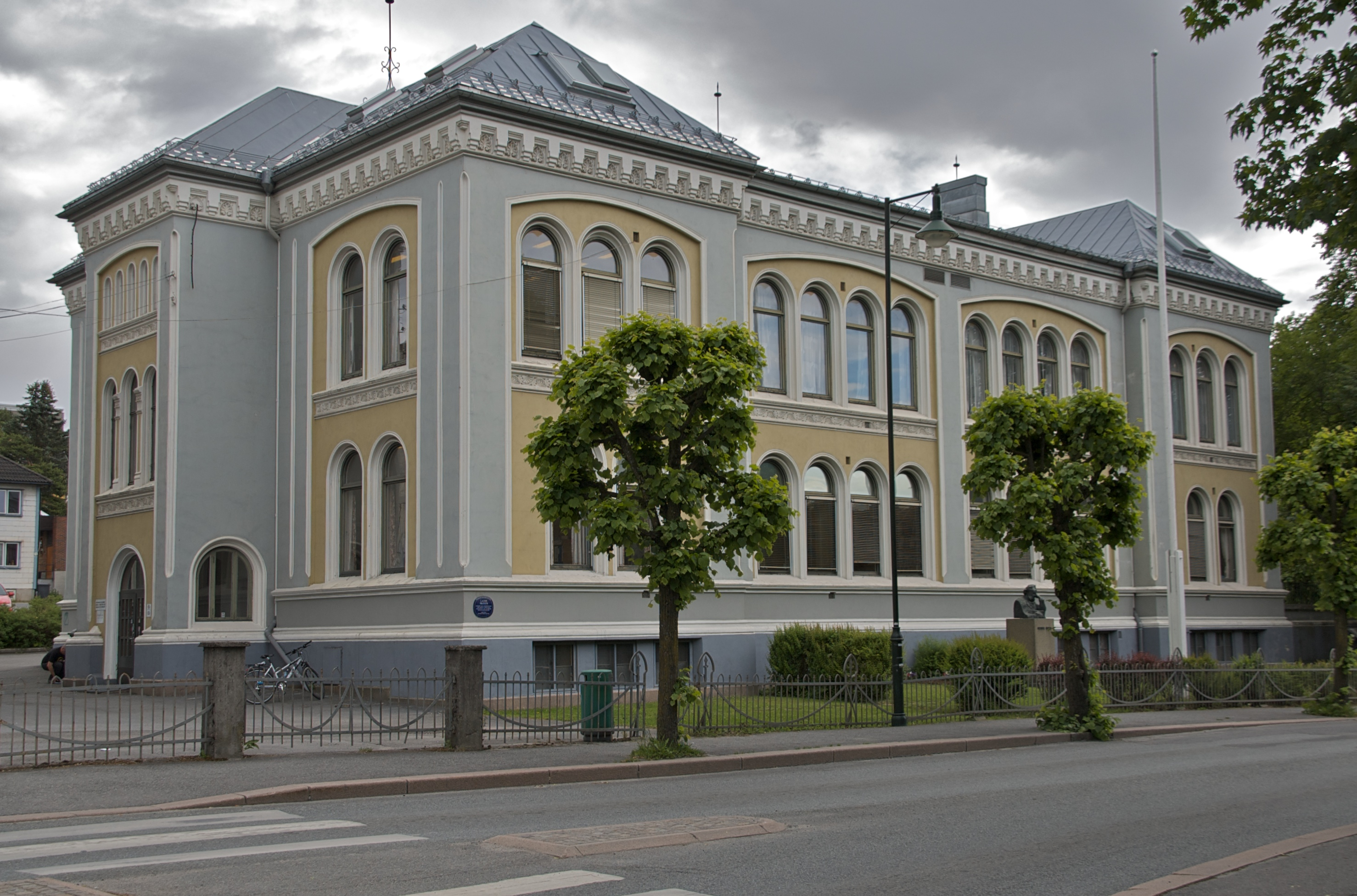
Skien Secondary school, Dept. Brekkeby

=== Churches ===
The Church of Norway has seven parishes (sokn) within Skien Municipality. It is part of the Skien prosti (deanery) in the Diocese of Agder og Telemark.

Churches in Skien Municipality
Parish (sokn)	Church name	Location of the church	Year built
Borgestad	Borgestad Church	Borgestad	1907
Gimsøy og Nenset	Gimsøy Church	Gimsøy	1922
Gimsøy og Nenset	Nenset Church	Tollnes	1961
Gjerpen	Gjerpen Church	Skien	1153
Gjerpen	Luksefjell Church	Luksefjell	1858
Gjerpen	Valebø Church	Valebø	1903
Gulset og Skotfoss	Gulset Church	Gulset	1986
Gulset og Skotfoss	Skotfoss Church	Skotfoss	1900
Kilebygda og Solum	Kilebygda Church	Kilebygda	1859
Kilebygda og Solum	Solum Church	Solum	1766
Melum	Melum Church	Melum	1728
Skien	Skien Church	Skien	1894

Skien Church is the largest church in Telemark county, and is famous for its two twin towers and great organ.

=== Ibsen and Telemark Museums ===
Skien was the birthplace of the author and playwright Henrik Ibsen, probably the most important writer to emerge from Norway. Many of Ibsen's plays are set in an unnamed provincial town that suggests Skien. The former Ibsen family homestead at Venstøp outside Skien was established as the Ibsen Museum in 1958. The Ibsen Museum has now been incorporated into the multi-site Telemark Museum, which includes several other historical sites.

=== Music and entertainment ===
Ibsenhuset is the local culture and conference center in Skien. It also houses concerts by international and national artists, opera, theatre and other cultural events. Skien kunstforening has a department in Ibsenhuset, and the local culture school and library are also located in the building. The venue is also home to the regional symphony orchestra, Grenland Symfoniorkester.

Teater Ibsen is the city theatre, and is still used for small productions.

In the summer of 2009 Elton John held a concert at the new Skagerak Arena, the soccer pitch for the local footfall team Odd. Next to Skagerak Arena is Stevneplassen, where car shows, concerts, flea markets and the annual "Handelsstevnet" – a trade fair with entertainment and a small amusement park – are held. The Handelsstevnet was closed down after the annual fair in 2011.

In Skotfoss, a small suburb of Skien further up the Telemark Canal, concerts are held at Løveid Sluser. There are plans to hold cultural events and concerts at Klosterøya (a downtown graffiti park).

=== Amusement parks ===
There are no local amusement parks in Skien. Lekeland was a small amusement park for children just outside the town, but it closed in 2008. Every year there is a traveling carnival with rides and merry-go-arounds for a week, in "Stevneplassen". There is an indoor waterpark and a big outdoor climbing park in Skien Fritidspark.

=== Frogner Manor in Skien ===
Frogner Manor (Frogner Hovedgård) is a manor house on the outskirts of Skien. The manor house was built for shipowner and timber merchant Christopher Hansen Blom (died 1879) and his wife Marie Elisabeth (Cappelen) Blom (died 1834). The main building is influenced by Italian Renaissance architecture. The garden was laid out in English landscape style in the 1850s.

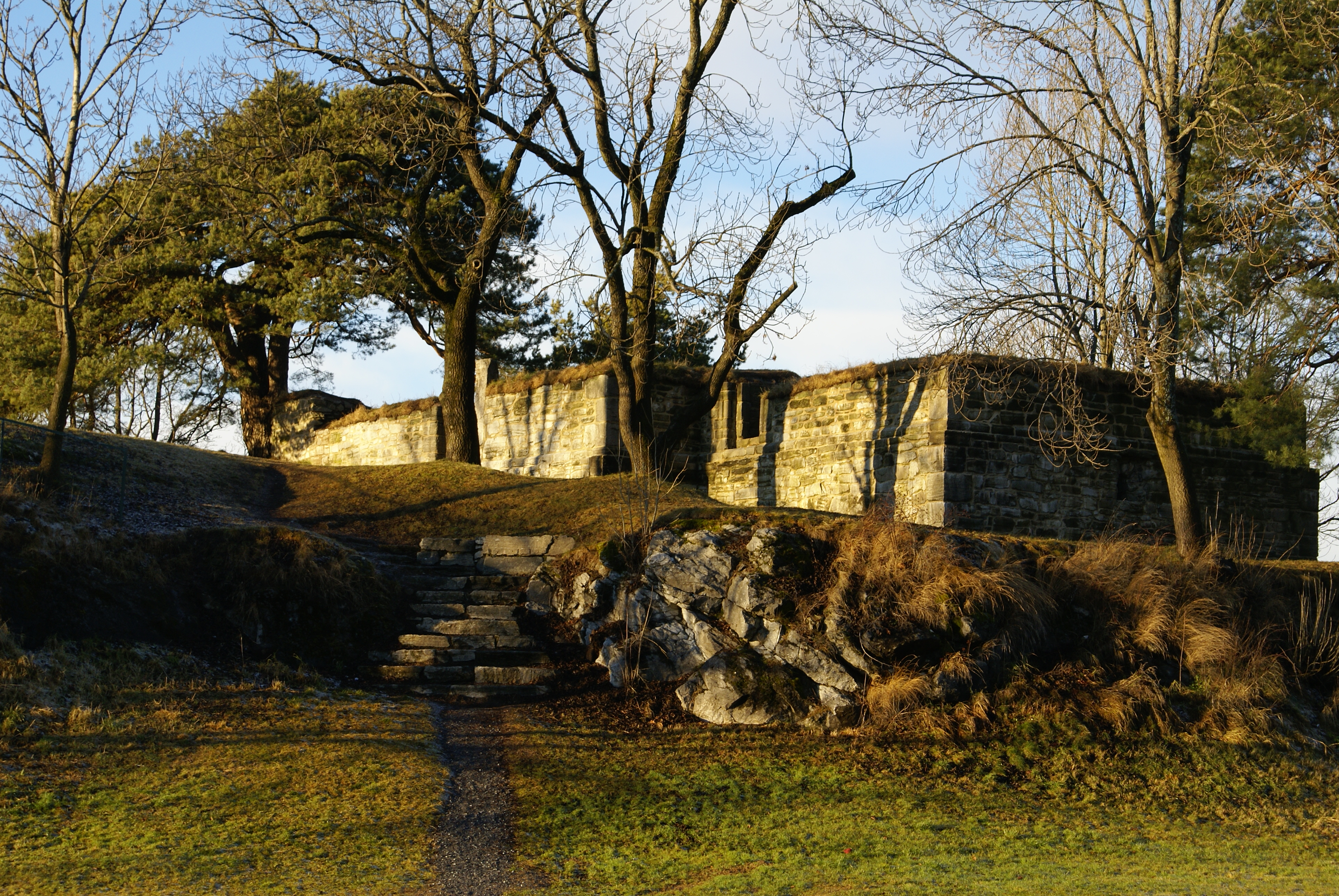
Kapitelberget church ruins

=== Kapitelberget ===
The Church on Kapitelberget (Kirken på Kapitelberget) was a medieval church. Kapitelberget was a private chapel on Bratsberg farm dating to the early 1100s. It is not known when the church went out of use, but Bratsberg farm burned down in 1156. in 1576, Peder Claussøn Friis reviewed it as a ruin. The site was first excavated in 1901. In 1928, Gerhard Fischer undertook restoration and preservation. The work was completed in 1933.

== Economy ==
=== Media ===
The daily newspapers Varden and Telemarksavisa are published in Skien. The local television for Telemark, TVTelemark, is located in Skien.

=== Commerce and industry ===
The largest industries are ABB (engineering firm), Norske Skog Union (a paper mill which was closed down in the spring of 2006), and EFD Induction (induction heating and induction welding).

Other important places of work are Telemark Hospital and Telemark county municipality. Agder Court of Appeal is located in Skien.

Because the E18 highway lies outside of the metropolitan area of Grenland, Skien has lost many important companies to the cities in Vestfold.

=== Shopping ===
Skien has three shopping malls:

- Handelsbyen Herkules (110 stores and services)
- Arkaden Skien Storsenter (47 stores and services)
- Lietorvet Senter (28 stores and services)

== Sports ==
=== Arenas ===
- Gjerpenhallen
- Grenland Speedway Arena
- Mælahallen
- Skagerak Arena
- Skienshallen
- Skien Ishall
- Skien Isstadion

=== Clubs ===
- Gjerpen IF (handball)
- Grenland Speedwayklubb (motorcycle speedway)
- Odds Ballklubb (football)
- Sceen Curling Klubb (curling)
- Skien Ishockeyklubb (ice hockey)
- Tollnes Ballklubb (football)
- Moflata table tennis (table tennis)
- Skien Innebandyklubb (Floorball)

== Notable people ==
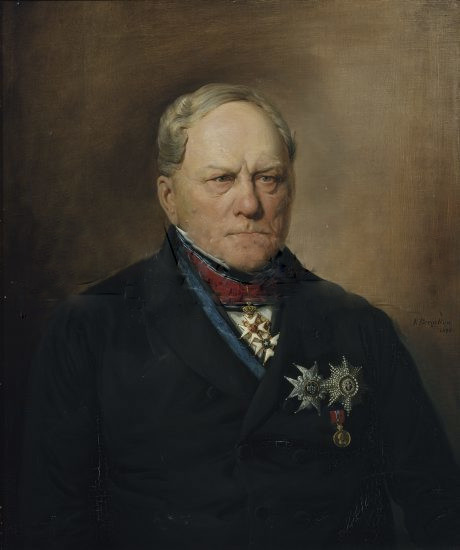
Severin Løvenskiold, 1854

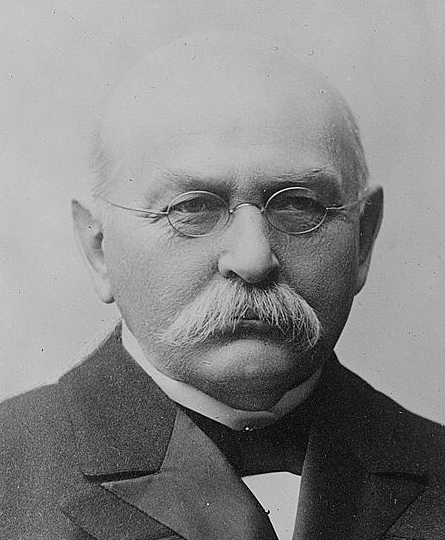
Gunnar Knudsen

=== Public service & public thinking ===
- Jørgen von Ansbach (ca.1510–ca.1590), a German-Norwegian timber merchant who was Mayor of Skien
- Diderik von Cappelen (1761–1828), a wholesaler, shipowner, estate owner, and politician
- Ulrich Fredrich von Cappelen (1770–1820), a ship owner and timber merchant
- Severin Løvenskiold (1777–1856), a landowner, Prime Minister, and Governor in Norway
- Peter Andreas Munch (1810–1863), a historian who worked on the medieval history of Norway
- Brynild Anundsen (1841–1913), a Norwegian-American editor and publisher
- Gunnar Knudsen (1848–1928), the Prime Minister of Norway from 1908–1910 & 1913–1920
- Hjalmar Johansen (1867–1913), a polar explorer
- Halvdan Koht (1873–1965), a historian and politician
- Carl Størmer (1874–1957), a mathematician and astrophysicist
- George Awsumb (1880–1959), a Norwegian-American architect
- Alfhild Hovdan (1904–1982), a tourist manager who started the Trafalgar Square Christmas tree
- Herman Wold (1908–1992), a Swedish econometrician and statistician
- Einfrid Halvorsen (born 1937), a trade unionist and mayor of Skien from 1983 to 1986
- Bjørn Tore Godal (born 1945), a politician who was Minister of Foreign Affairs from 1994–1997
- Jon Fredrik Baksaas (born 1954), the CEO of Telenor
- Margareth Øvrum (born 1958), an engineer and executive VP of Statoil
- Eskil Pedersen (born 1984), the leader of the Labour Party´s Youth Organization, AUF, during terrorist attack on AUF at Utøya on 22 July 2011
- Bastian Vasquez (1990 – ca.mid 2015), a Norwegian ISIS jihadist

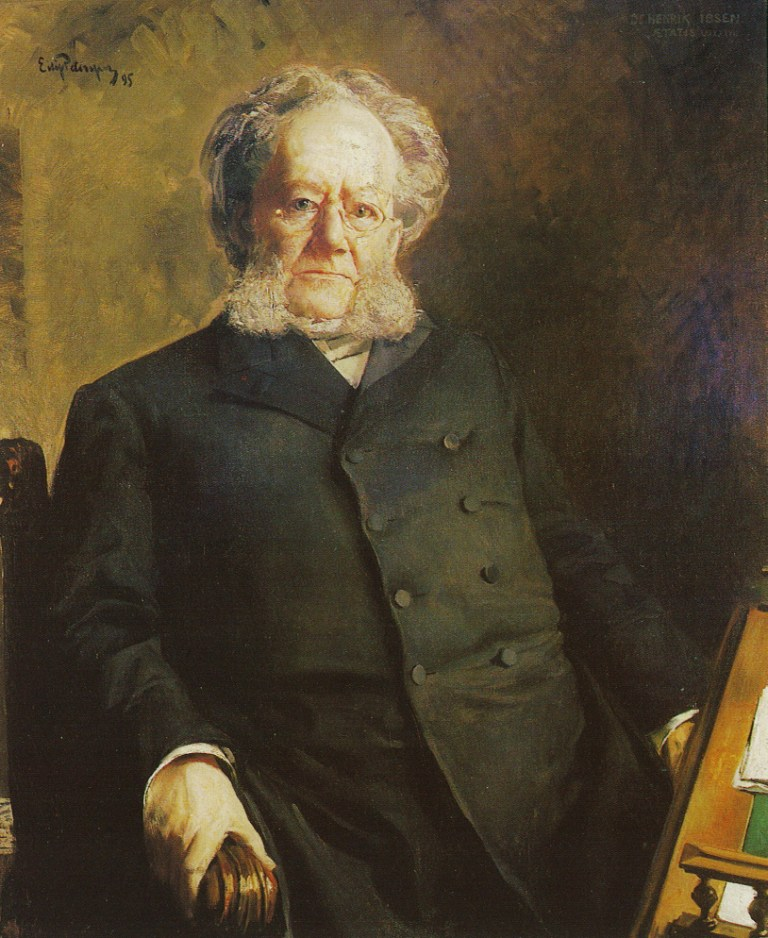
Henrik Ibsen, 1895

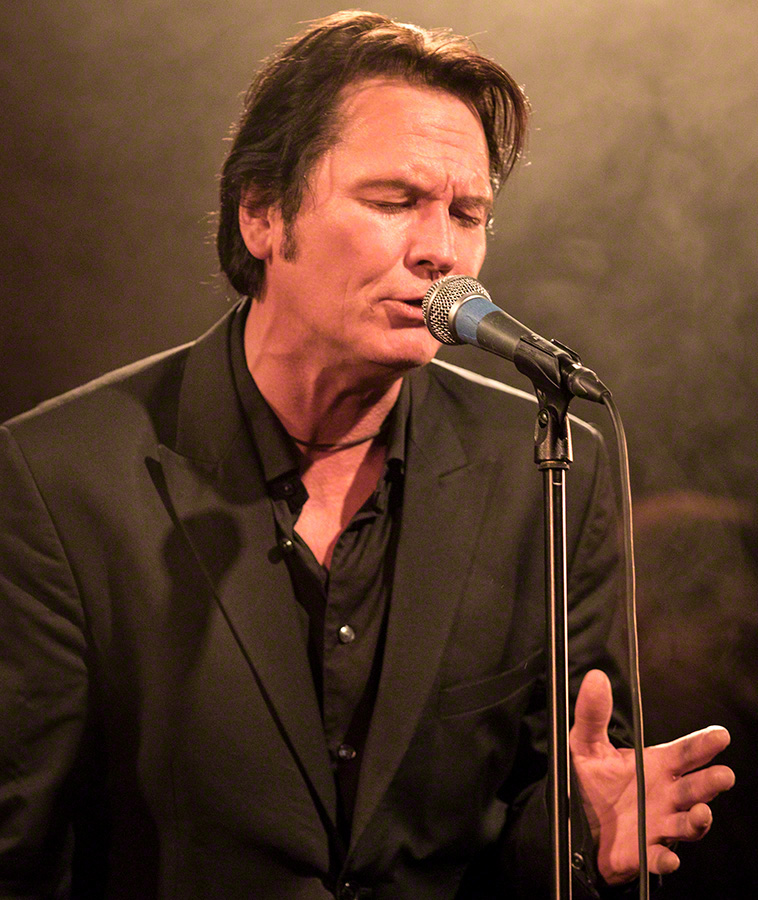
Pål Flåta, 2016

=== The arts ===
- August Cappelen (1827–1852), a painter of melancholic, dramatic landscapes
- Henrik Ibsen (1828–1906), a playwright and theatre director
- Iver Holter (1850–1941), a composer and conductor
- Rolf Christensen (1894–1962), an actor in operettas, plays and farces, and film director
- Ella Peaters (1907–1991), an actress, revue artist, singer, and circus performer
- Aage Samuelsen (1915–1987), an evangelist, singer, and composer
- Knut Wigert (1916–2006), an actor, known for his Ibsen roles
- Kari Løvaas (1939–2025), an operatic soprano
- Tor Åge Bringsværd (born 1939), an author, playwright, editor, and translator
- Yngvar Numme (1944–2023), a singer, actor, revue writer, and director
- Torhild Staahlen (1947–2022), an operatic mezzo-soprano
- Iver Kleive (born 1949), a composer and organist
- Audun Kleive (born 1961), a jazz drummer
- Bugge Wesseltoft (born 1964), a jazz musician, pianist, composer, and producer
- Gisle Kverndokk (born 1967), a contemporary composer
- Heidi Hauge (born 1967), a Norwegian folk and country music singer
- Paal Flaata (born 1968), a vocalist
- Bård Tufte Johansen (born 1969), a comedian
- Wetle Holte (born 1973), a jazz drummer and composer
- Lage Lund (born 1978), a jazz guitarist
- Atle Pettersen (born 1989), a singer and songwriter
- Julie Bergan (born 1994), a singer and songwriter

=== Sport ===
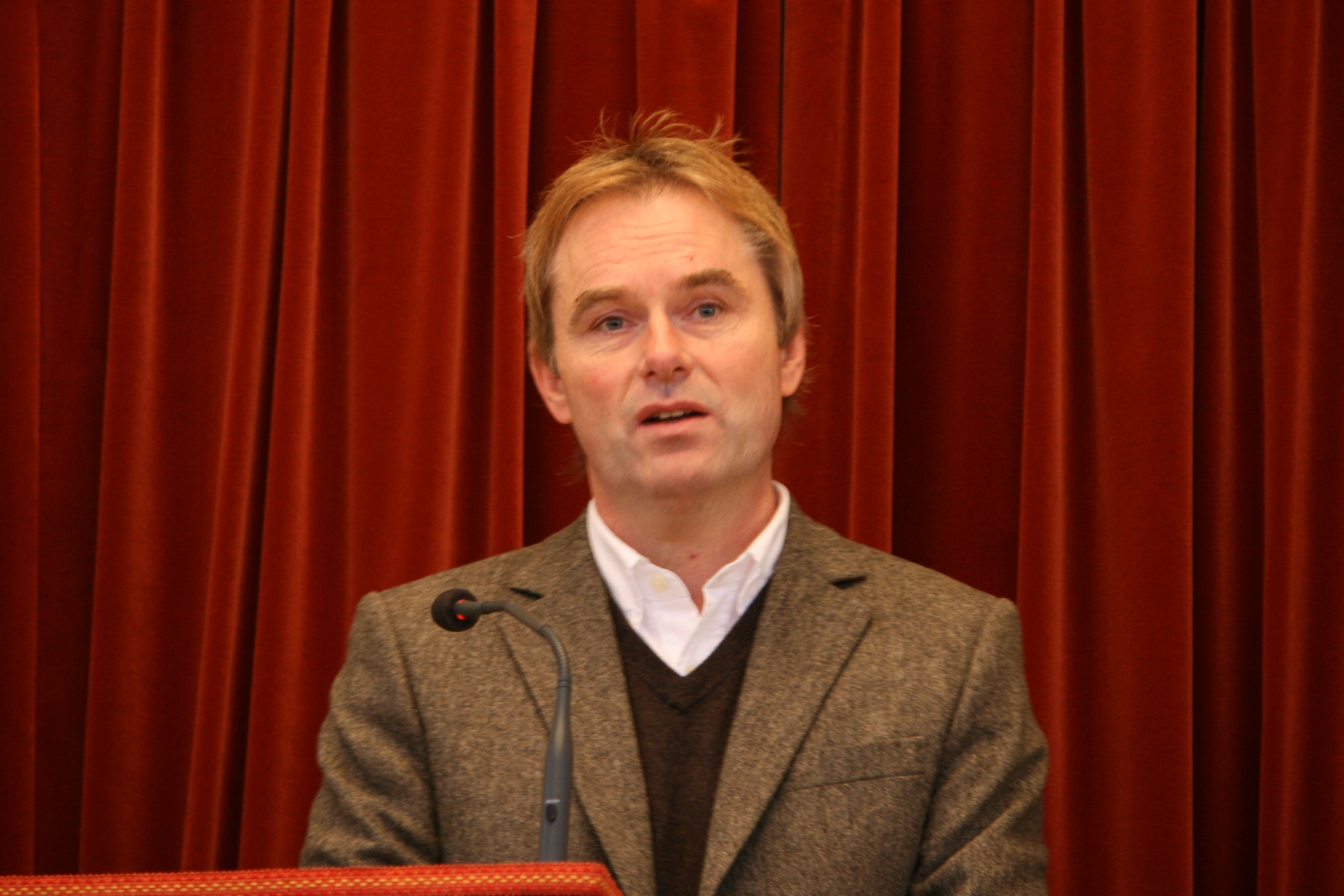
Dag Erik Pedersen, 2008

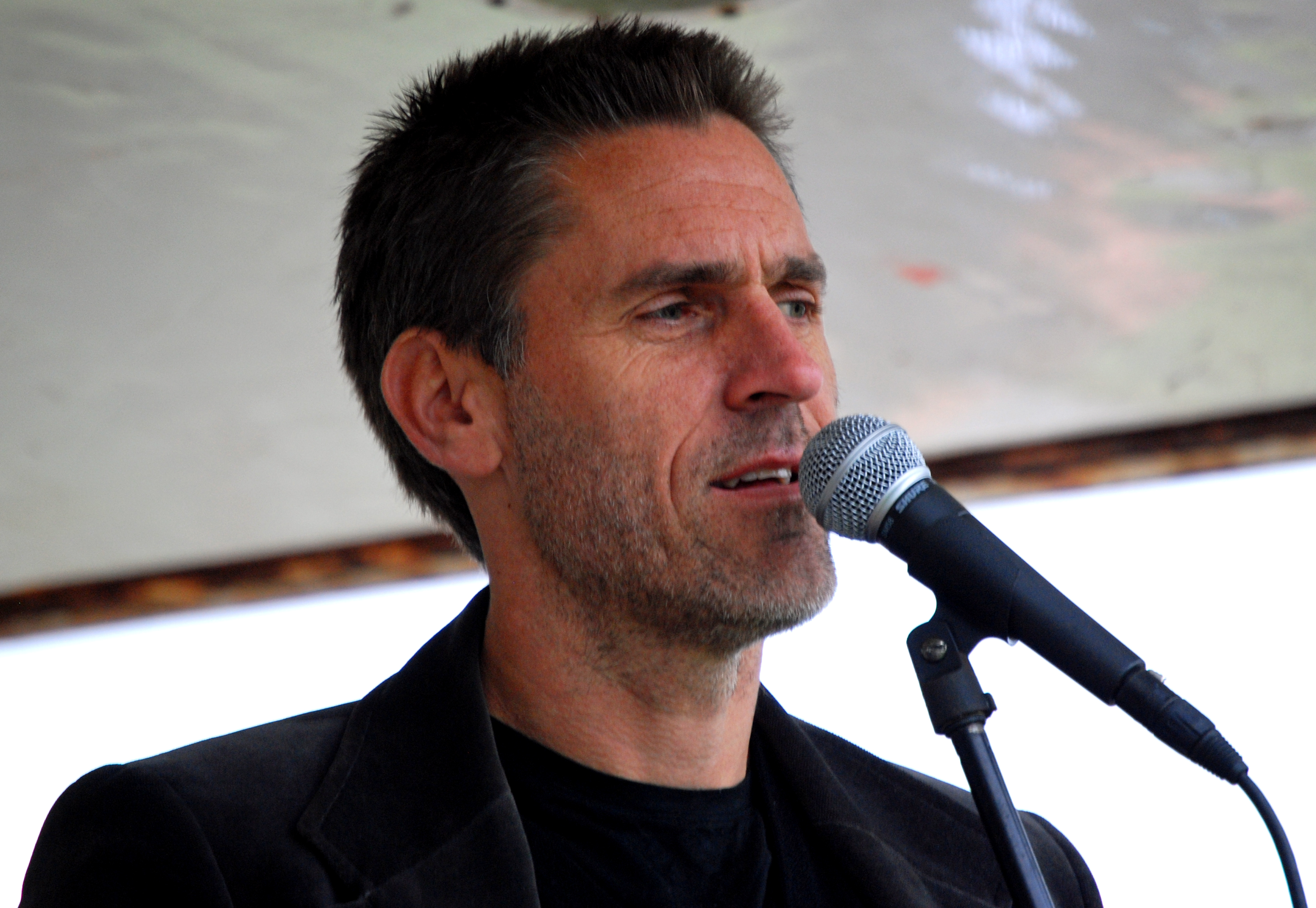
Tommy Svindal Larsen, 2010

- Per Mathias Jespersen (1888–1964), a gymnast who was a team silver medallist at 1908 Summer Olympics
- Werner Nilsen (1904–1992), an American high-scoring soccer forward
- Nicolai Johansen (1917–1999), the Secretary Gen. the Norwegian Football Association from 1955–1983
- Geir Karlsen (born 1948), a retired footballer with nearly 300 club caps and 32 for Norway
- Dag Erik Pedersen (1959–2024), a road racing cyclist and anchorman with NRK
- Jeanette Nilsen (born 1972), a handball player who was a team bronze medallist at the 2000 Summer Olympics
- Tommy Svindal Larsen (born 1973), a retired footballer with 517 club caps and 24 for Norway
- Torjus Hansén (born 1973), a retired footballer with 373 club caps
- Frode Johnsen (born 1974), a retired footballer with 518 club caps and 35 for Norway
- Alexander Aas (born 1978), a retired Norwegian footballer with 350 club caps
- Erik Midtgarden (born 1987), a footballer with 320 club caps

== Twin towns – sister cities ==
Skien has sister city agreements with the following places:

- Loimaa, Finland
- Minot, United States
- Mosfellsbær, Iceland
- Onești, Romania
- Sorrento, Italy
- Thisted, Denmark
- Uddevalla, Sweden

== Gallery ==
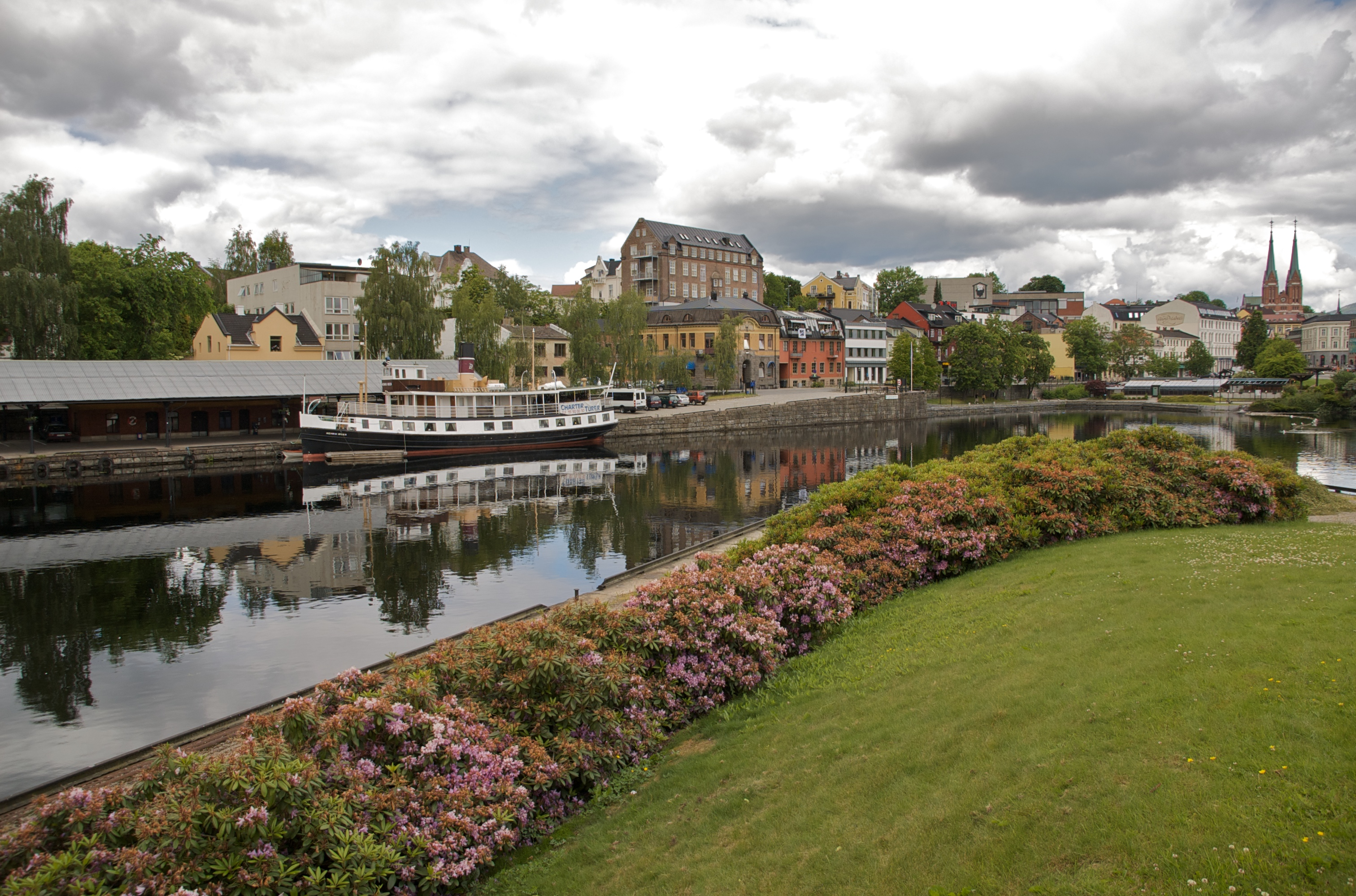
The harbour in the centre of Skien

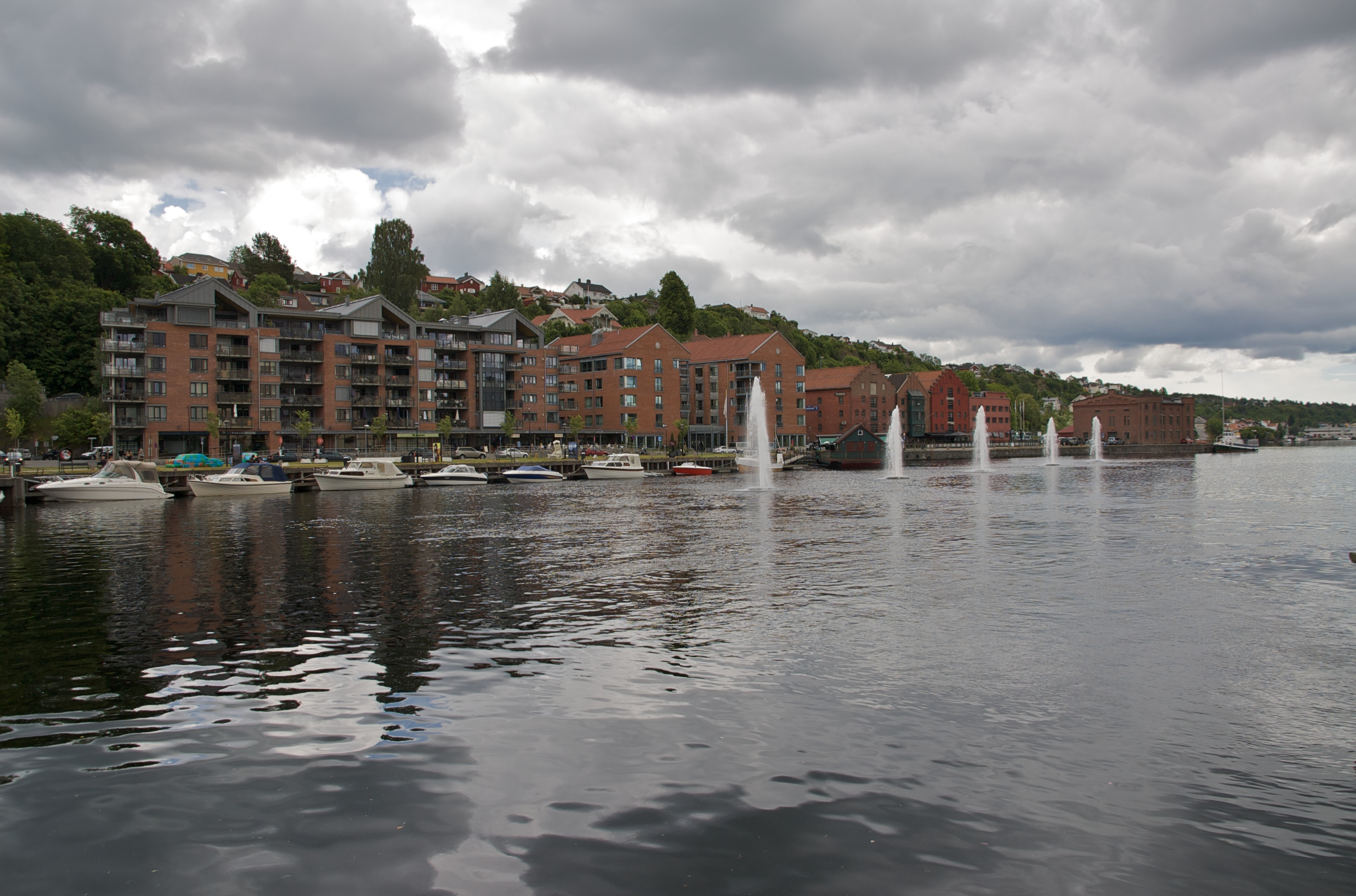
The harbour

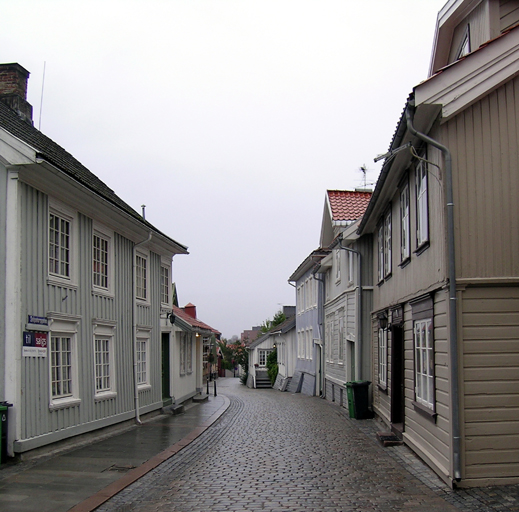

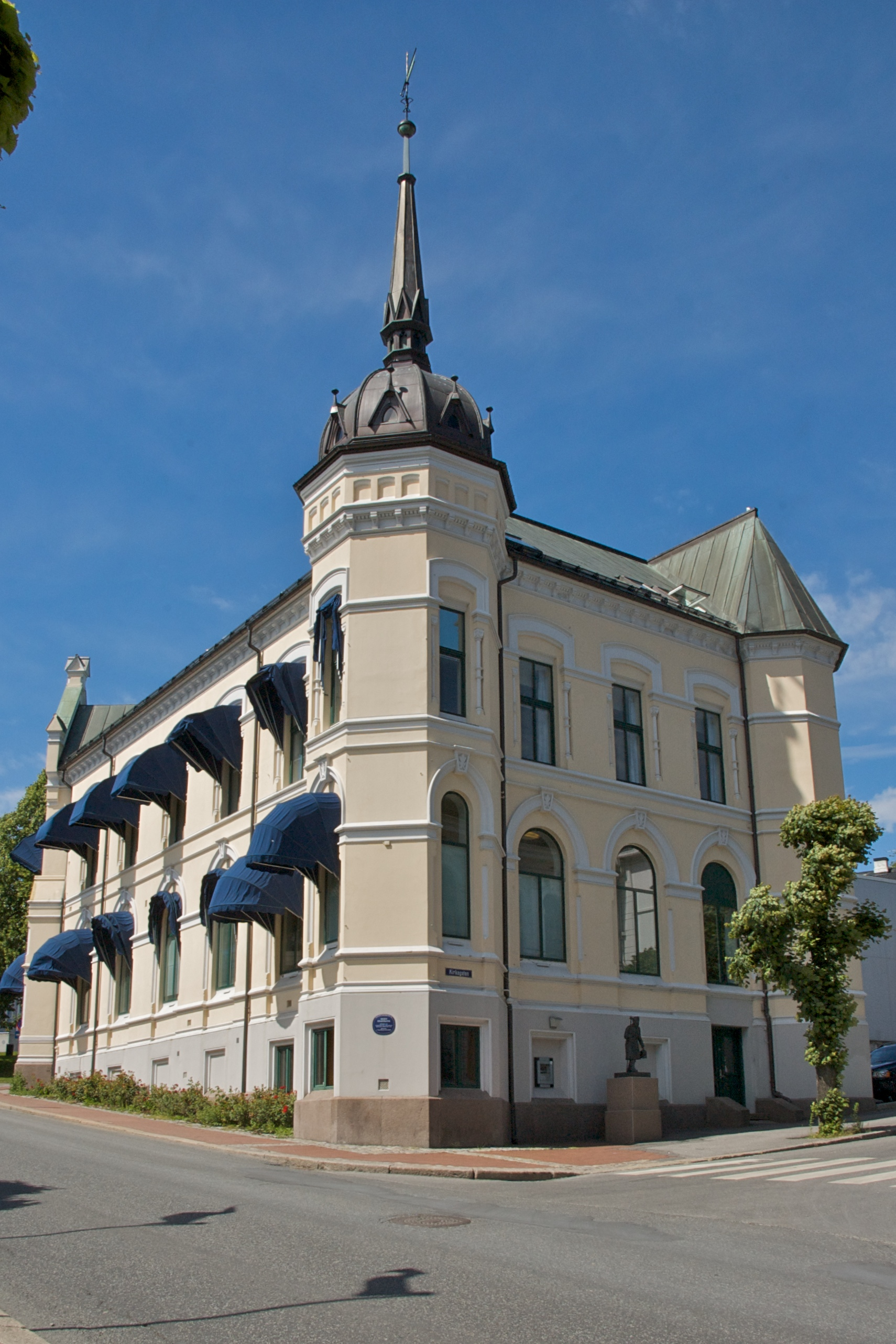
The main bank in Skien (Skien sparebank)

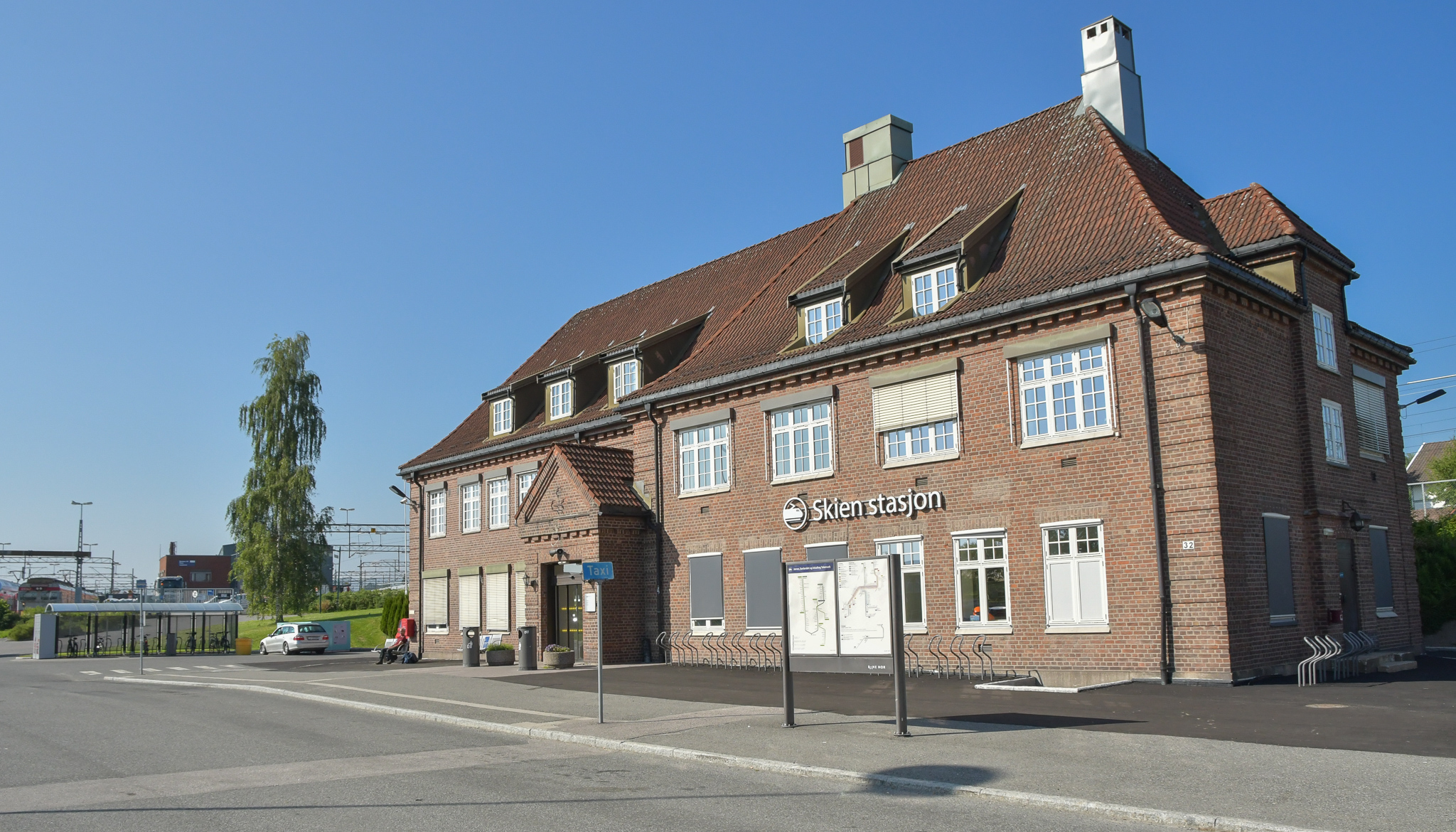
Skien Station
