= Sneltvedt =

Village in Skien Municipality, Norway

- Village
- Interactive map of Sneltvedt
- Coordinates: 59.22215°N 9.63909°E
- Country: Norway
- Region: Eastern Norway
- County: Telemark
- District: Grenland
- Municipality: Skien Municipality

Area
  - Total: 0.19 km^{2} (0.073 sq mi)
- Elevation: 65 m (213 ft)

Population (2025)
  - Total: 264
  - Density: 1,389/km^{2} (3,600/sq mi)
- Time zone: UTC+01:00 (CET)
  - Summer (DST): UTC+02:00 (CEST)
- Post Code: 3719 Skien

Sneltvedt is a village in Skien Municipality in Telemark county, Norway. The village is located about 2 kilometres (1.2 mi) east of the town of Skien. The village of Hoppestad lies about 6 kilometres (3.7 mi) to the northwest.

The 0.19-square-kilometre (47-acre) village has a population (2025) of 264 and a population density of 1,389 inhabitants per square kilometre (3,600/sq mi).

Sneltvedt is also a surname that is used by people who historically lived here. According to Statistics Norway in 2023, there were about one hundred people who have "Sneltvedt" as their last name.
