= Kilebygda =

Village in Skien Municipality, Norway

- Village
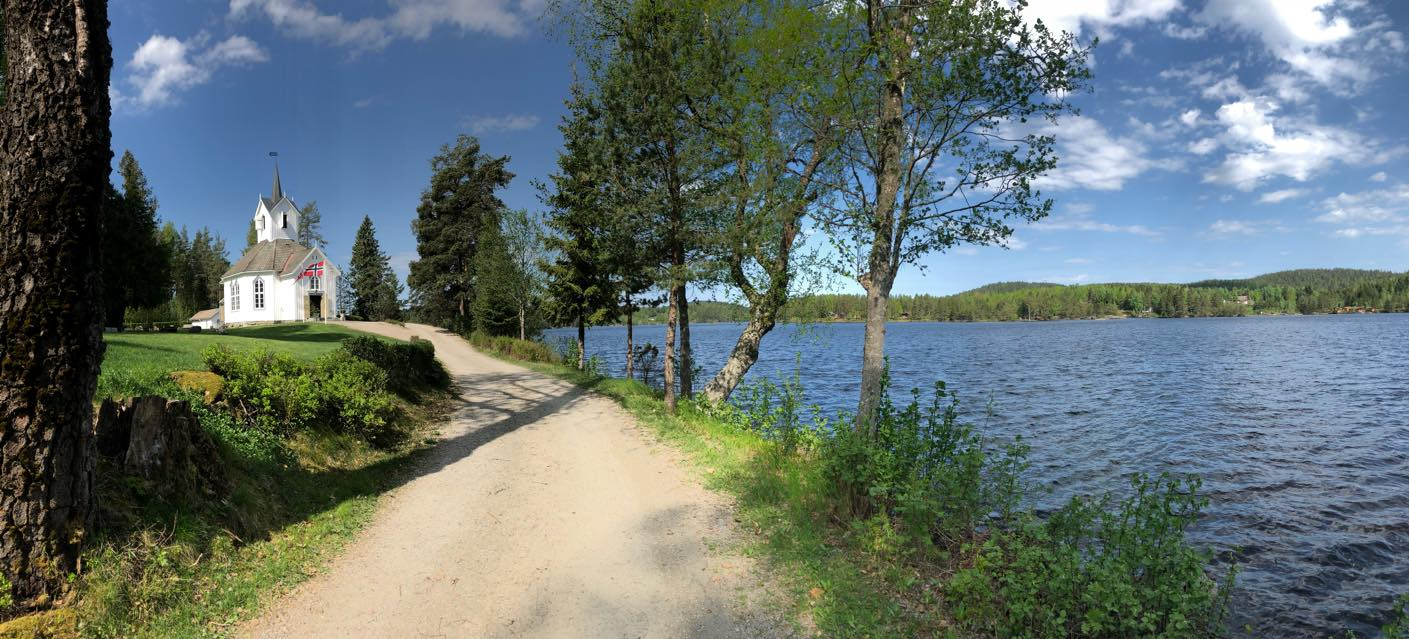
- View of the village church
- Interactive map of Kilebygda
- Coordinates: 59.11711°N 9.43161°E
- Country: Norway
- Region: Eastern Norway
- County: Telemark
- District: Grenland
- Municipality: Skien Municipality
- Elevation: 65 m (213 ft)
- Time zone: UTC+01:00 (CET)
  - Summer (DST): UTC+02:00 (CEST)
- Post Code: 3739 Skien

Kilebygda is a village in Skien Municipality in Telemark county, Norway. The village is located about 16 kilometres (9.9 mi) to the southwest of the town of Skien. The village lies on the southern shore of the lake Kilevann, about 12 kilometres (7.5 mi) south of the village of Melum. The border with Drangedal Municipality lies about 7 kilometres (4.3 mi) to the southwest.

Kilebygda Church is located in the village. There is also a small Montesorri school in Kilebygda.
