= Rolf Erling Andersen =

Norwegian politician (1947–2021)

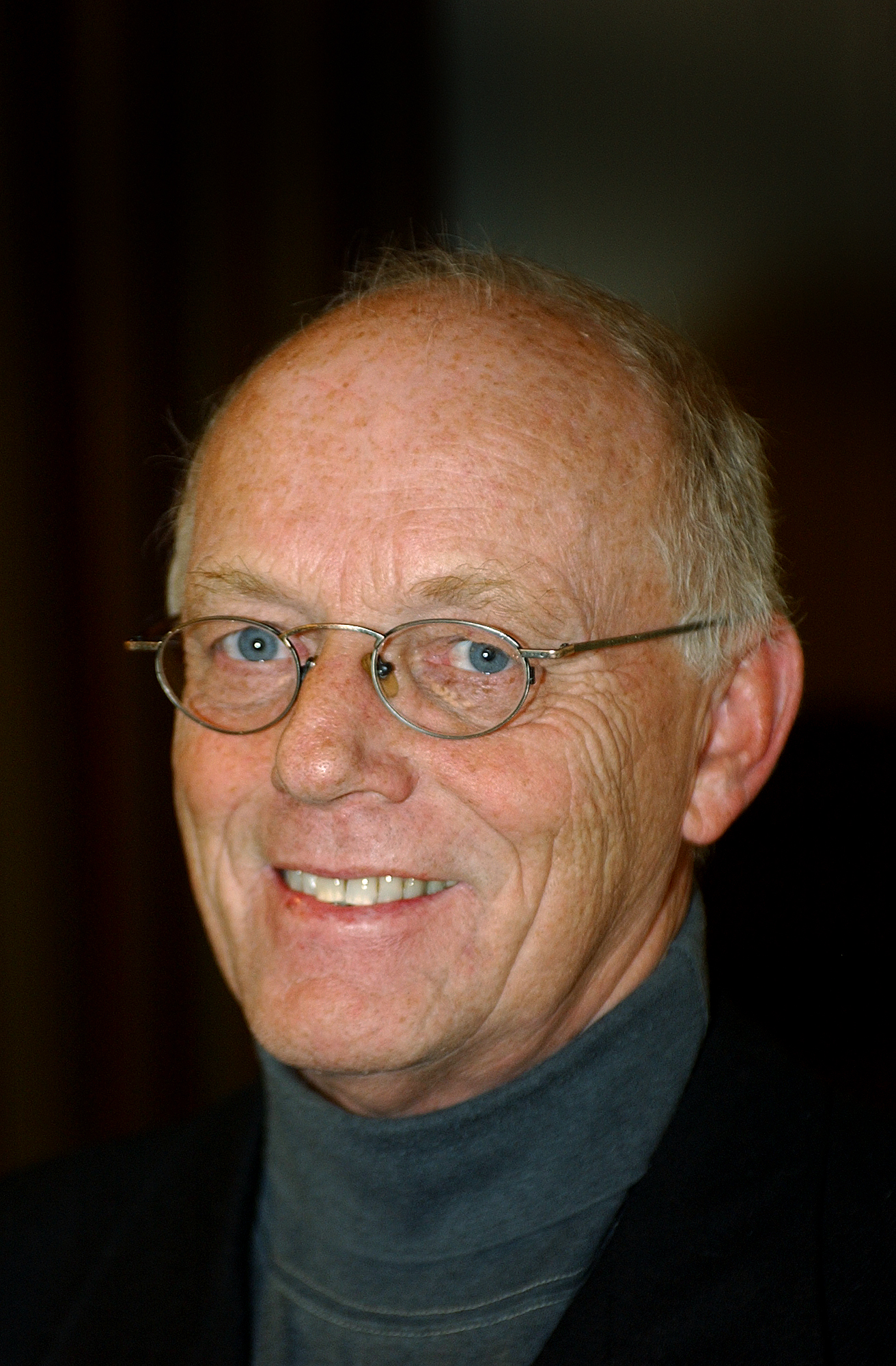
Rolf Erling Andersen.

Rolf Erling Andersen (3 July 1947 – 7 August 2021) was a Norwegian politician for the Labour Party.

He was elected to Skien city council in 1983, and served as mayor in 1993, 1995–1999 and 2003–2011. He served as a deputy representative to the Parliament of Norway from Telemark during the terms 1997–2001 and 2001–2005. In total he met during 123 days of parliamentary session. He was a central board member of the Labour Party from 1995 to 2003.

He worked in the power company Skiensfjordens kommunale kraftselskap. He died in August 2021.
