= Valebø =

Village in Skien Municipality, Norway

- Village
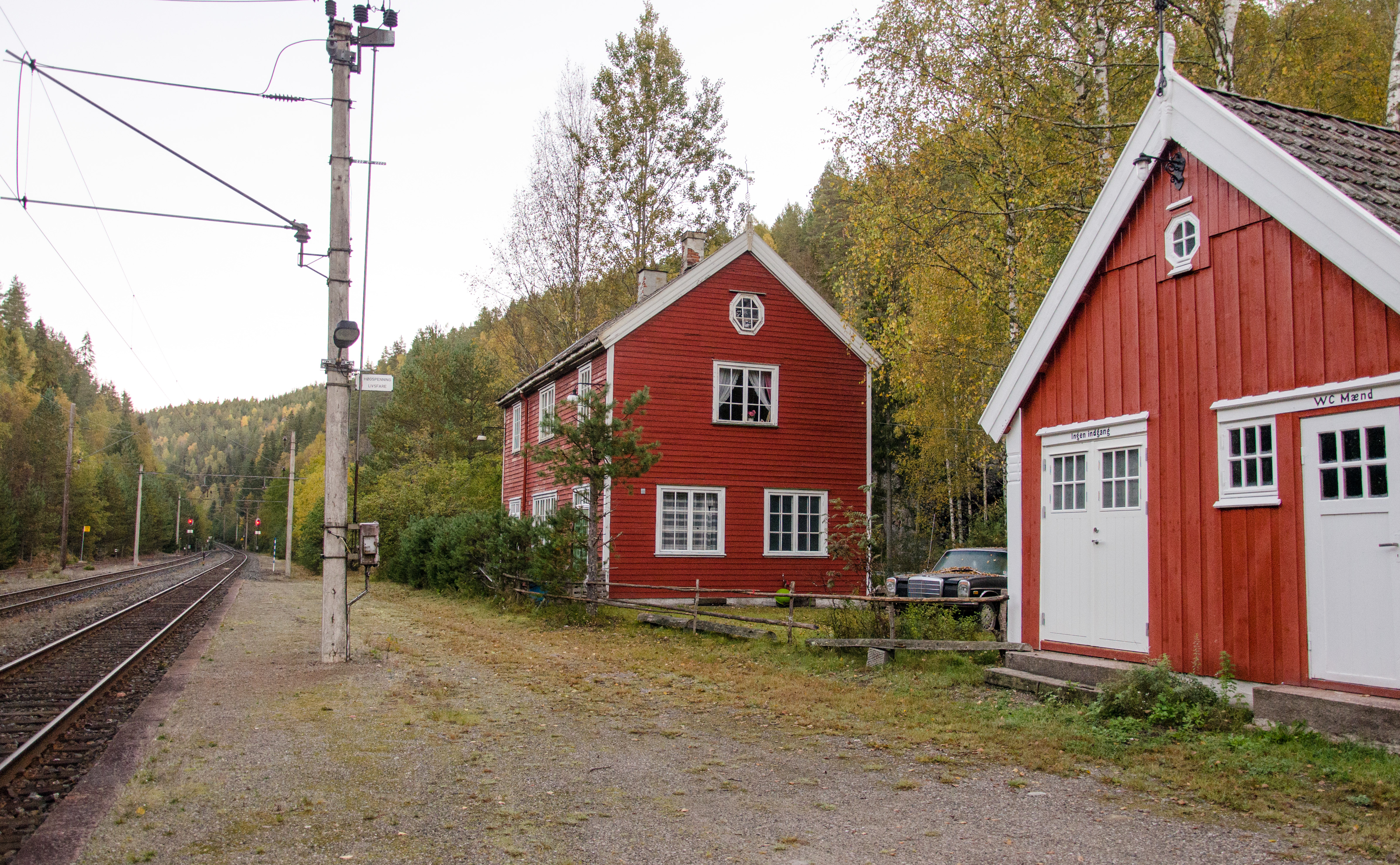
- View of the village railway station
- Interactive map of Valebø
- Coordinates: 59.31268°N 9.33182°E
- Country: Norway
- Region: Eastern Norway
- County: Telemark
- District: Grenland
- Municipality: Skien Municipality
- Elevation: 105 m (344 ft)
- Time zone: UTC+01:00 (CET)
  - Summer (DST): UTC+02:00 (CEST)
- Post Code: 3721 Skien

Valebø is a village in Skien Municipality in Telemark county, Norway. The village is located on the eastern shore of Norsjø, across the lake from the villages of Ulefoss and Helgja in Nome Municipality. The village of Valebø lies about 25 kilometres (16 mi) to the northwest of the town of Skien, about 15 kilometres (9.3 mi) northwest of the village of Hoppestad, and about 12 kilometres (7.5 mi) to the south of Nordagutu in Midt-Telemark Municipality.

The village is the site of Valebø Church. The Bratsbergbanen railway line stops at a station in Valebø.

== History ==
Valebø was administratively a part of Holla Municipality from 1 January 1838 (when municipalities were established in Norway) until 1 January 1964 when it became a part of Skien Municipality. At that time Valebø had 259 inhabitants.
