= Valebø Church =

Church in Telemark, Norway

- Valebø kirke
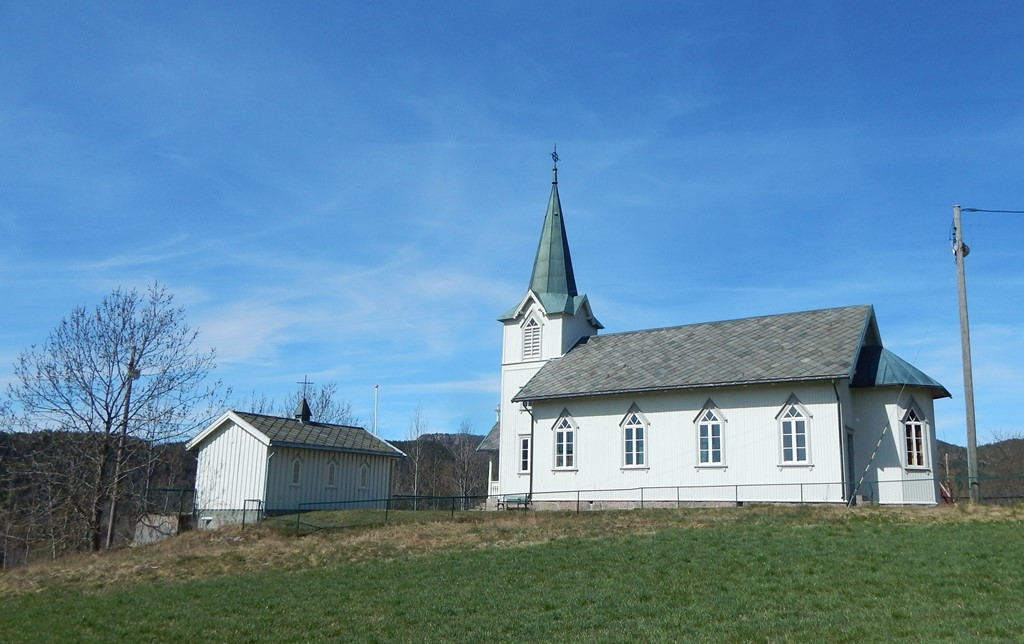
- View of the church
- Valebø Church
- 59°18′47″N 9°19′51″E
- Location: Skien Municipality, Telemark
- Country: Norway
- Denomination: Church of Norway
- Churchmanship: Evangelical Lutheran

History
- Status: Parish church
- Founded: 1903
- Consecrated: 24 June 1903

Architecture
- Functional status: Active
- Architect: H. Lie
- Architectural type: Long church
- Completed: 1903 (123 years ago)

Specifications
- Capacity: 150
- Materials: Wood

Administration
- Diocese: Agder og Telemark
- Deanery: Skien prosti
- Parish: Gjerpen
- Norwegian Cultural Heritage Site
- Type: Church
- Status: Not protected
- ID: 85744

Valebø Church (Norwegian: Valebø kirke) is a parish church of the Church of Norway in Skien Municipality in Telemark county, Norway. It is located in the village of Valebø. It is one of the churches for the Gjerpen parish which is part of the Skien prosti (deanery) in the Diocese of Agder og Telemark. The white, wooden church was built in a long church design in 1903 using plans drawn up by the architects H. Lie and A. Sigvartsen. The church seats about 150 people.

== History ==
Historically, the Valebø area was part of the Romnes Church parish, but in 1867, the church was closed after a new, larger Holla Church was opened. The people of Valebø then had a much longer journey to church. The parish opened a cemetery in Valebø soon after this, but it was not until around 1900 when permission was given to build an annex chapel in Valebø. It was designed by H. Lie and built by builder Svend Sigurdsen in 1902–1903. The new building was consecrated on 24 June 1903 (midsummer day). The wooden timber-framed long church with a church porch and bell tower on the west end a chancel in the east that has a half-octagon shaped apse. Around the turn of the 21st century, the church was made into a parish church and it was then renamed Valebø Church (instead of the historic name Valebø Chapel).

== See also ==
- List of churches in Agder og Telemark
