= Hans Severin Arentz =

Norwegian politician

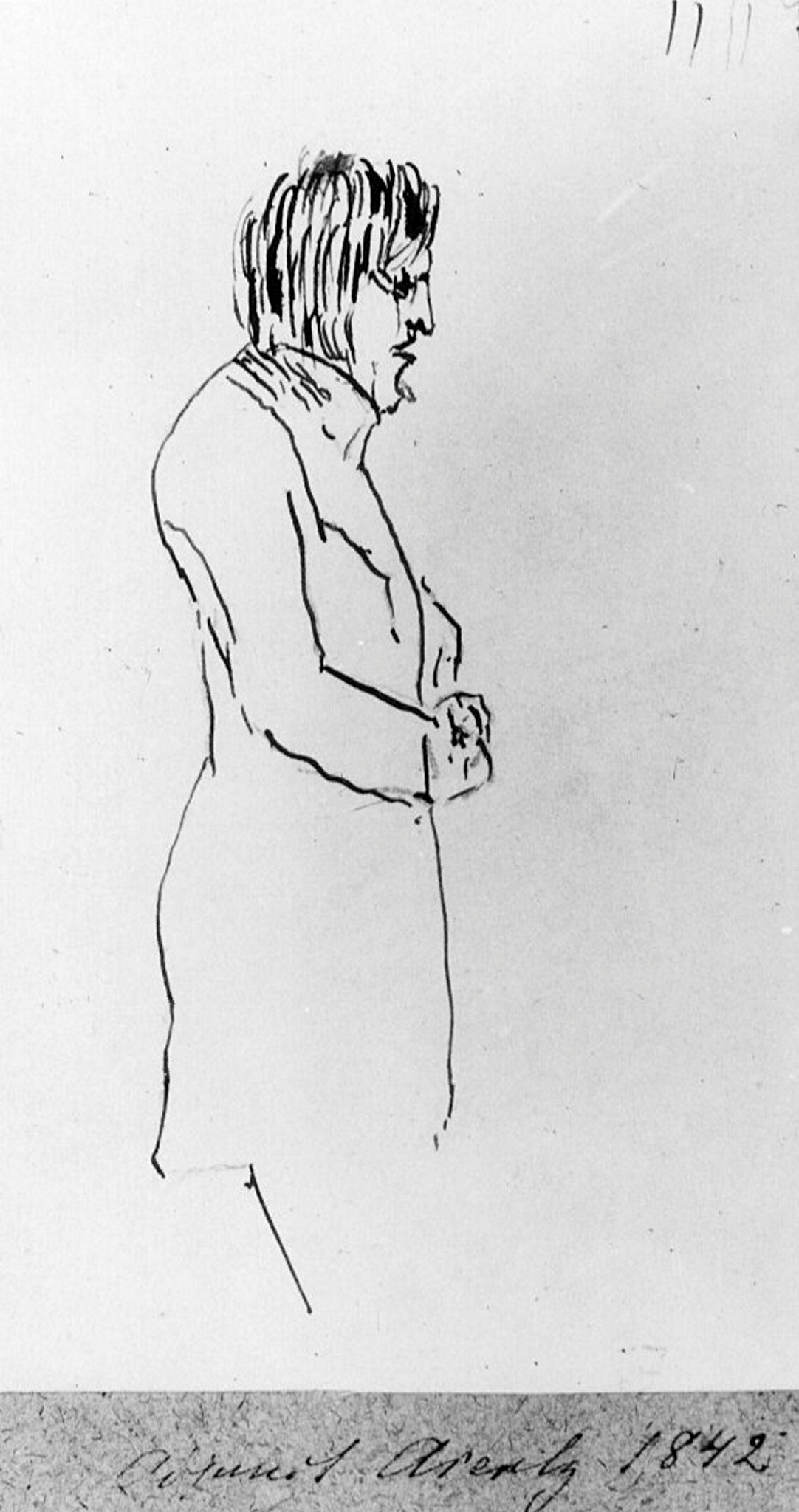
Hans Severin Arentz (1806-1875) designed by Gustav Adolph Lammers

Hans Severin Arentz (15 November 1806 – 13 February 1875) was a Norwegian politician.

He was born in Farsund to Jens Christian Arentz (1763–1828) and his wife Anne Elisabeth (1775–1851), née Urbye. He later moved to Skien, and married 8 October 1838 to Margrethe Cathrine Stockmann (born 19 November 1806). The couple had two children.

Arentz served as mayor of Skien Municipality from 1840 to 1842, 1845 to 1847, 1848 to 1850 and 1851 to 1860. He was elected to the Parliament of Norway in 1842, representing the constituency of Skien og Porsgrund. In 1857 he was elected as deputy representative, before being elected to one last term in 1859.

Outside politics he worked as a secondary school teacher.
