= Kilebygda Church =

Church in Telemark, Norway

- Kilebygda kirke
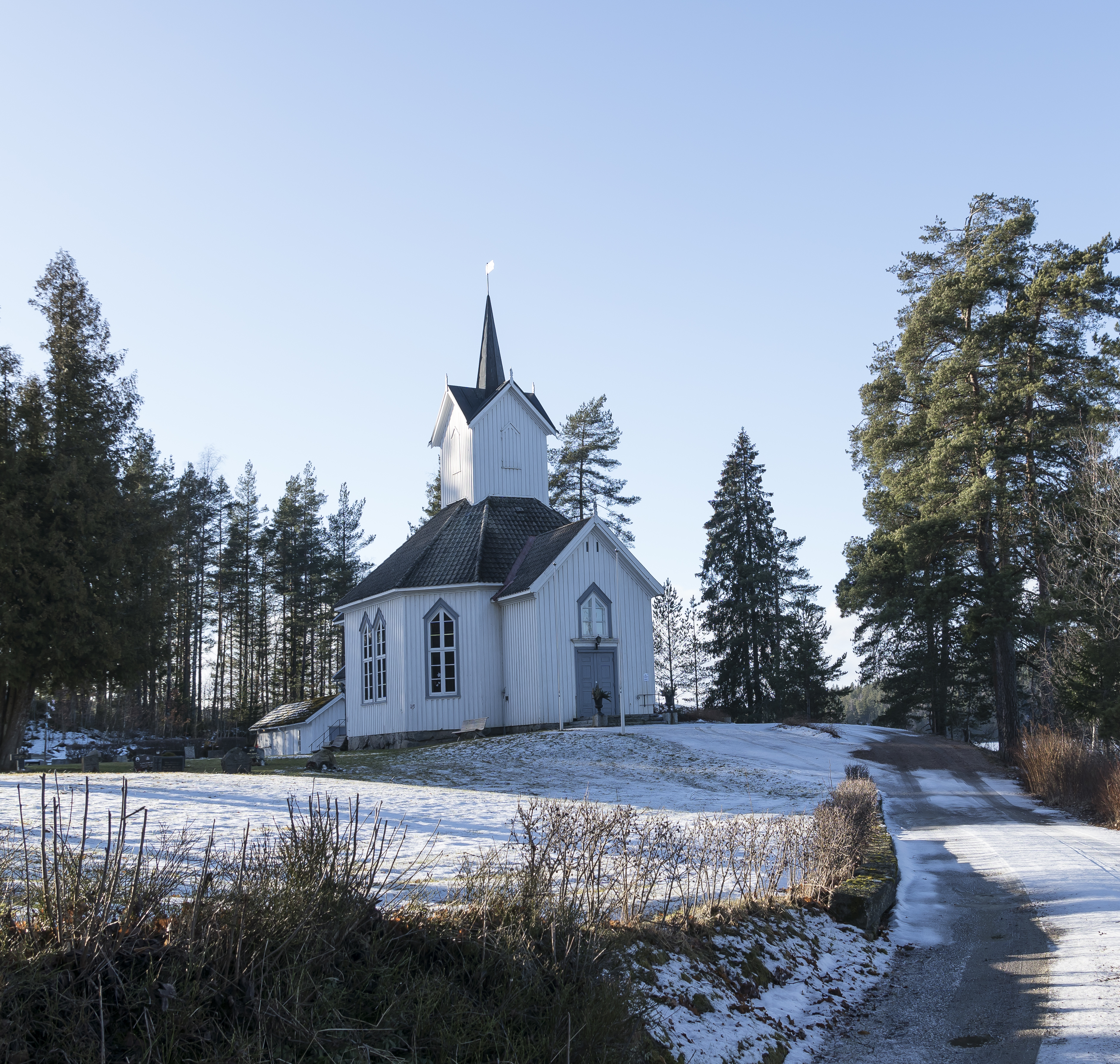
- View of the church
- Kilebygda Church
- 59°07′02″N 9°25′54″E
- Location: Skien Municipality, Telemark
- Country: Norway
- Denomination: Church of Norway
- Churchmanship: Evangelical Lutheran

History
- Status: Parish church
- Founded: 1859
- Consecrated: 15 September 1859

Architecture
- Functional status: Active
- Architect: Christian Heinrich Grosch
- Architectural type: Octagonal
- Completed: 1859 (167 years ago)

Specifications
- Capacity: 300
- Materials: Wood

Administration
- Diocese: Agder og Telemark
- Deanery: Skien prosti
- Parish: Kilebygda og Solum
- Norwegian Cultural Heritage Site
- Type: Church
- Status: Not protected
- ID: 84770

Kilebygda Church (Norwegian: Kilebygda kirke) is a parish church of the Church of Norway in Skien Municipality in Telemark county, Norway. It is located in the village of Rognsbru. It is one of the churches for the Kilebygda og Solum parish which is part of the Skien prosti (deanery) in the Diocese of Agder og Telemark. The white, wooden church was built in an octagonal design in 1859 using plans drawn up by the architect Christian Heinrich Grosch. The church seats about 300 people.

== History ==
The area of Kilebygda was historically land owned by the Løvenskiold family and it was the site of the Bolvik ironworks. When the ironworks went bankrupt in 1841, the area was bought up by many local farmers. These farmers lived quite a distance from the Melum Church and it was a long journey across land and crossing the lake Kilevannet. On 15 March 1854, the municipal council was set to discuss acquiring more land to expand the cemetery surrounding Solum Church. The farmers from Kilebygda then made their request for a new church there. The farmers argued that building a new church and cemetery in Kilebygda would avoid the need to acquire more land for a larger cemetery in Solum. The municipality agreed to build a church in Kilebygda in November of 1854. The budget for the new church was 2000 kr because the local farmers had all agreed to provide the wood for the church themselves. Gunnar Kongerød was hired to build the new church using plans by the architect Christian Heinrich Grosch. The plans called for an octagonal nave with a square chancel on the east side and a square church porch on the west end. There is a tower on the center of the nave's roof. The church was completed in the summer of 1859 and it was consecrated on 15 September 1859.

The Kilebygda Church cemetery was established at the same time as the church. The ground surrounding the church was not particularly suitable for a burial ground unfortunately. In 1883, a new cemetery was built about 1 kilometre (0.62 mi) to the south in Rognsbru instead. This new cemetery was on good burial ground, but this caused dissatisfaction among the people in the parish. A few years later, the land of the old cemetery was filled in with better soil and then the original cemetery was put back into use. Both cemeteries are still in use.

== Media gallery ==
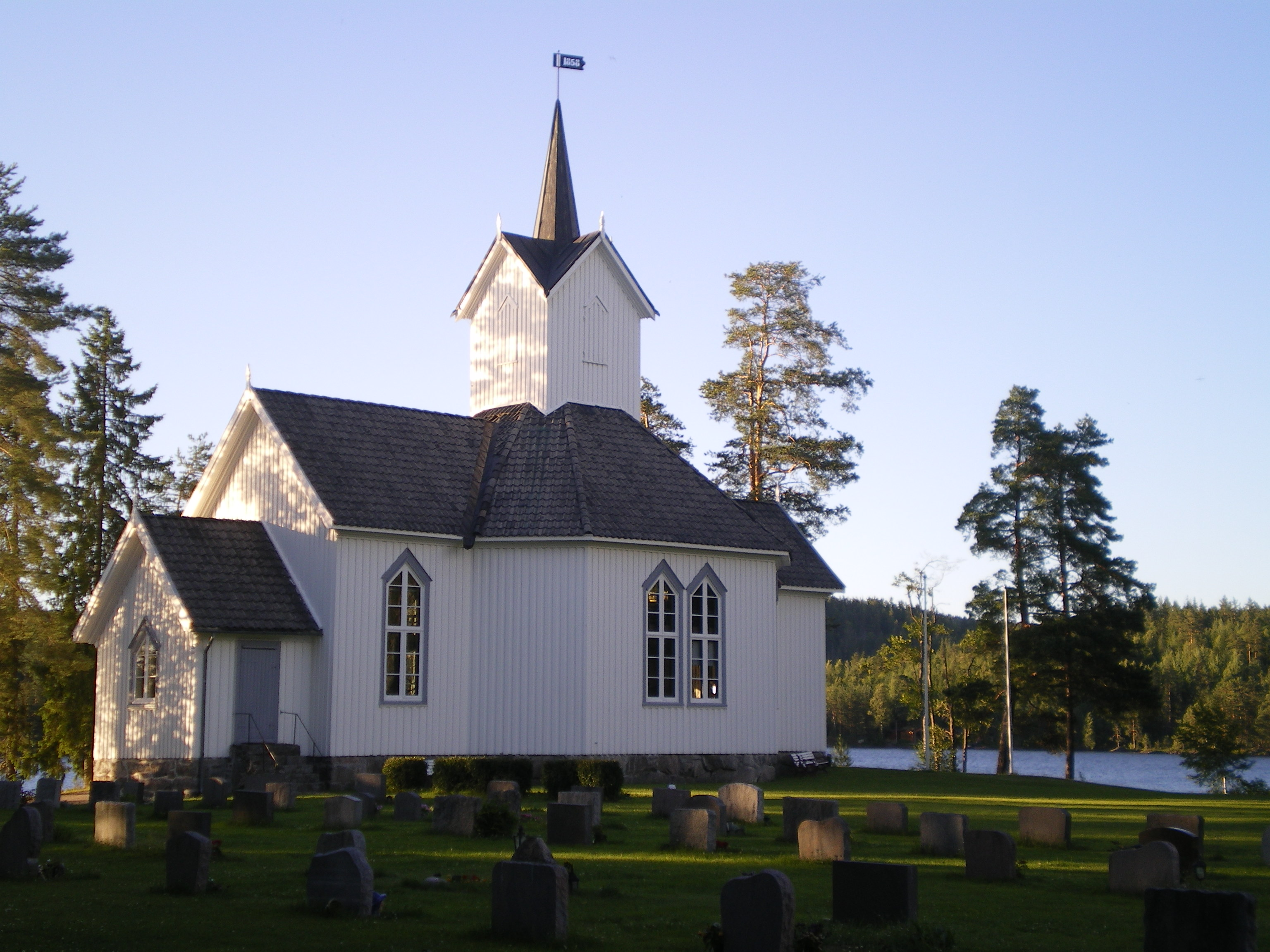

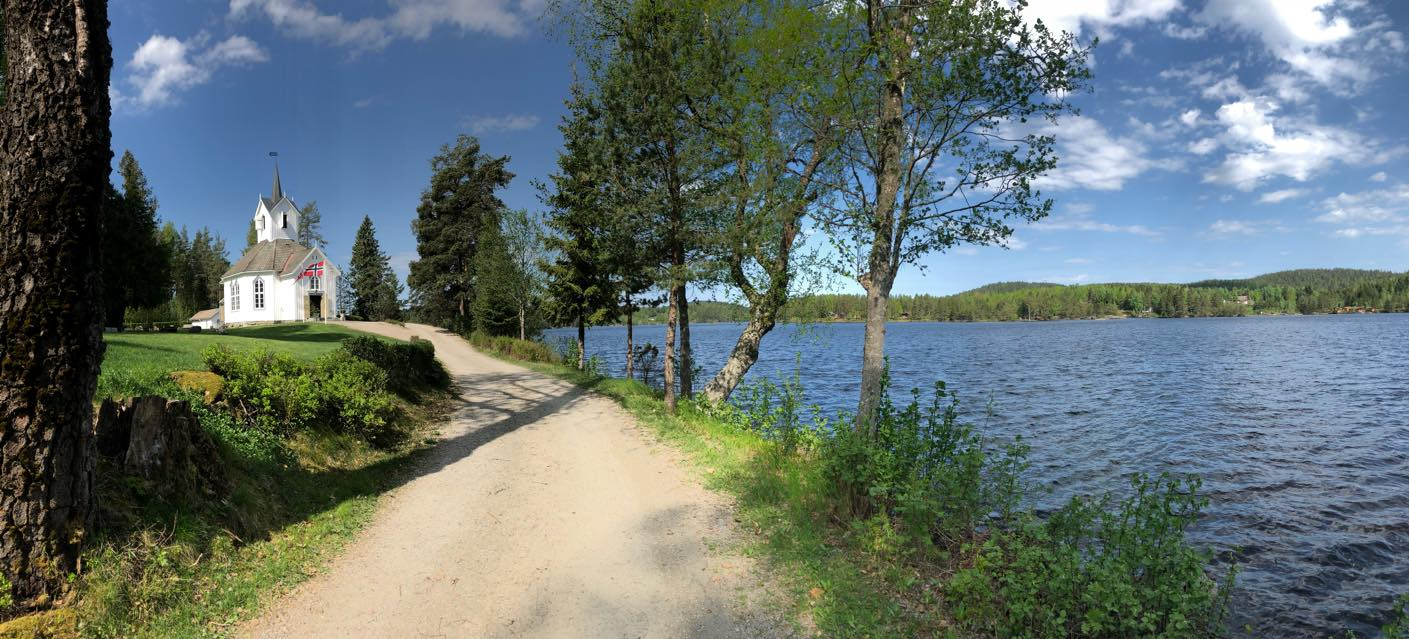

== See also ==
- List of churches in Agder og Telemark
