= Skien Isstadion =

Ice skating rink in Skien, Norway

Coordinates: 59.1846°N 9.5964°E

- Interactive map of Skien Isstadion
- Location: Moflataveien 38; 3733 Skien
- Owner: Skien
- Operator: Skien

Construction
- Opened: 1985

Skien Isstadion is an outdoor ice skating rink with artificial ice in Skien, Norway. It is part of Skien Fritidspark at Klosterskogen. The ice rink is used mostly by schools and families with small children. It is also used for speed skating practice. The outdoor season starts in mid-October and lasts until Easter. The ice skating rink was opened in 1985 and is equipped with floodlights.

Skien as a city hosted the Norwegian Championships:

- Men's Allround in 1938, 1953, 1970 and 2002
- Women's Allround in 1955 and 2002
- Men's and Women's sprints in 1976 and 1990

== See also ==
- Klosterskogen Travbane
