= Ambros Sollid =

Norwegian agronomist and politician

- Born: 21 May 1880; Hitterdal Municipality, Norway
- Died: 9 February 1973 (aged 92)
- Occupation: Politician

Ambros Sollid (21 May 1880 – 9 February 1973) was a Norwegian agronomist and politician.

He was born in Hitterdal Municipality to teacher Ambros Torgrimsen Sollid and Gunhild Smedsrud. He was elected representative to the Storting for the period 1937–1945, for the Liberal Party.

Sollid was elected member of the municipal council of Skien Municipality from 1928 to 1937, and served as mayor 1935–1937.

== Selected works ==
- Telemark Landbruksselskap 1777–1877 (1927)
- Felleskjøpet gjennom 50 år 1896–1946 (1946)
