= Hoppestad =

Village in Skien Municipality, Norway

- Village
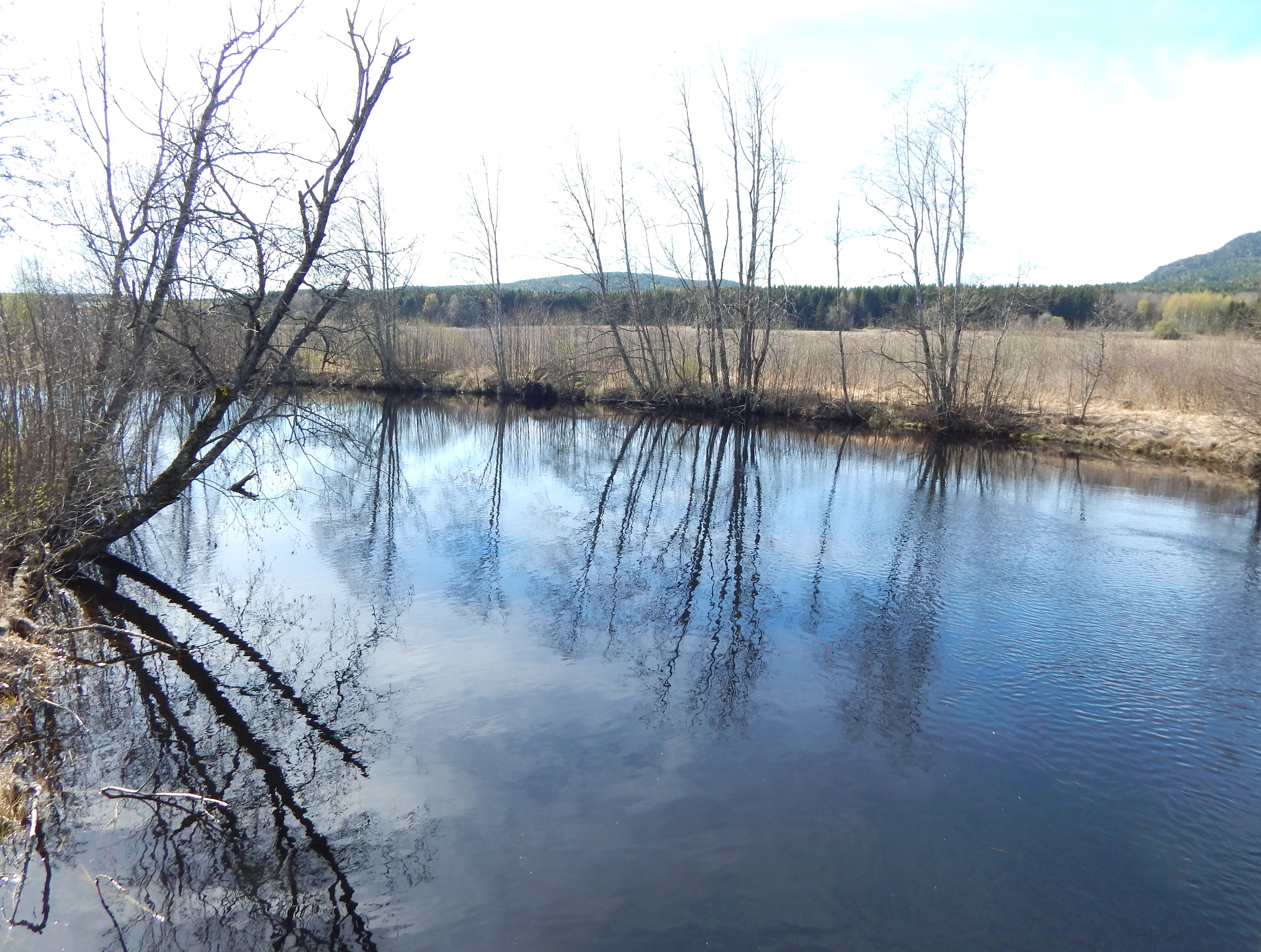
- View of the river running through the village
- Interactive map of Hoppestad
- Coordinates: 59.25651°N 9.56392°E
- Country: Norway
- Region: Eastern Norway
- County: Telemark
- District: Grenland
- Municipality: Skien Municipality

Area
  - Total: 0.52 km^{2} (0.20 sq mi)
- Elevation: 40 m (130 ft)

Population (2012)
  - Total: 571
  - Density: 1,098/km^{2} (2,840/sq mi)
- Time zone: UTC+01:00 (CET)
  - Summer (DST): UTC+02:00 (CEST)
- Post Code: 3721 Skien

Hoppestad is a village in Skien Municipality in Telemark county, Norway. The village is located about 5 kilometres (3.1 mi) north of the town of Skien. The village of Luksefjell lies about 20 kilometres (12 mi) to the north and the village of Valebø lies about 18 kilometres (11 mi) to the northwest. The Hoppestadelva river runs through the village.

The 0.52-square-kilometre (130-acre) village had a population (2012) of 571 and a population density of 1,098 inhabitants per square kilometre (2,840/sq mi). Since 2012, the population and area data for this village area has not been separately tracked by Statistics Norway, but now it is considered part of the Porsgrunn/Skien metropolitan area.
