= Carl Stousland =

Norwegian merchant, banker and politician (1860–1941)

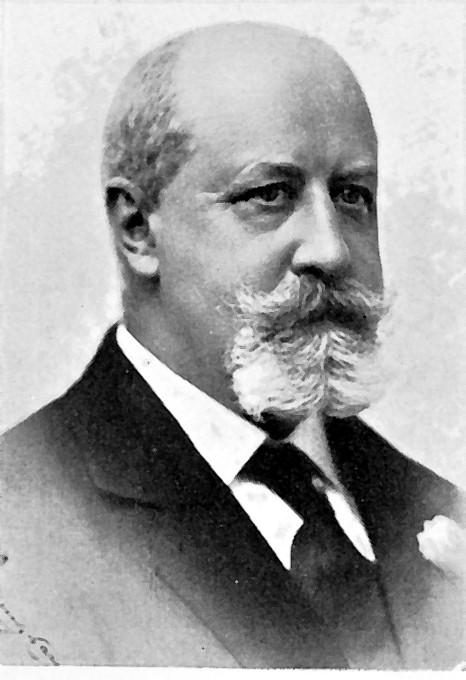
Carl Stousland

Carl Stousland (25 October 1860 – 23 August 1941) was a Norwegian merchant, banker and politician.

== Biography ==
Stousland was born at Skien in Telemark, Norway. He was the son of ship captain Hans Jacob Stousland (1828–1913). His mother Hedvig Ibsen Stousland (1831-1920) was the sister of noted playwright, Henrik Ibsen. He was a cousin of Prime Minister Sigurd Ibsen (1859–1930).

From 1874 he worked in his uncle's grocery store in Skien and in 1885 he took over the shop. From 1888 he ran his own insurance business in Skien and from 1912 to 1932 he was stock exchange commissioner in Skien.

He served five terms as a Member of Parliament for Skien, representing the Liberal Party and as an independent, from 1898 to 1909 and from 1919 to 1921. He also served as Mayor of Skien from 1917 to 1919. He was appointed British Vice Consul in 1911.
