= Skien Fritidspark =

Multi-purpose stadium in Skien, Norway

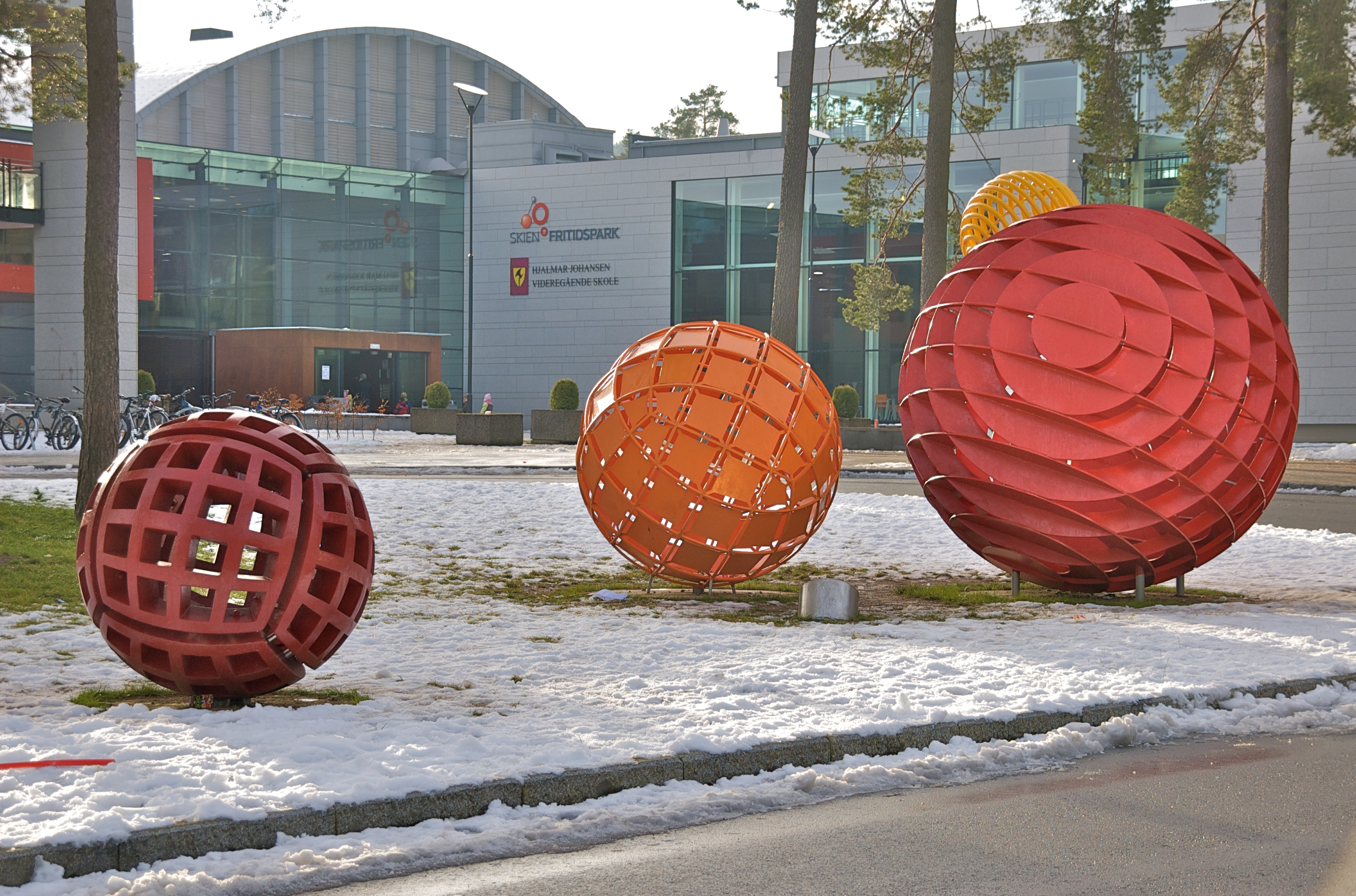
- Interactive map of Skien Fritidspark
- Location: Moflataveien 38; 3733 Skien, Norway
- Coordinates: 59°11′11″N 009°35′45″E
- Owner: Skien
- Operator: Skien
- Capacity: Handball: 2,800

Construction
- Opened: 1968 as Skienshallen
- Expanded: 2008

Tenant
- Gjerpen (Handball)

Skien Fritidspark is a multi-purpose stadium located in Skien, Norway. It was completed in 2008, and is built around Skienshallen from 1968. The arena comprises two indoor sportshalls, an ice hockey venue, a large water park and several outdoor sports facilities.

In 1975 Skienshallen hosted the European Gymnastics Championships, where Nadia Comăneci had her international breakthrough.

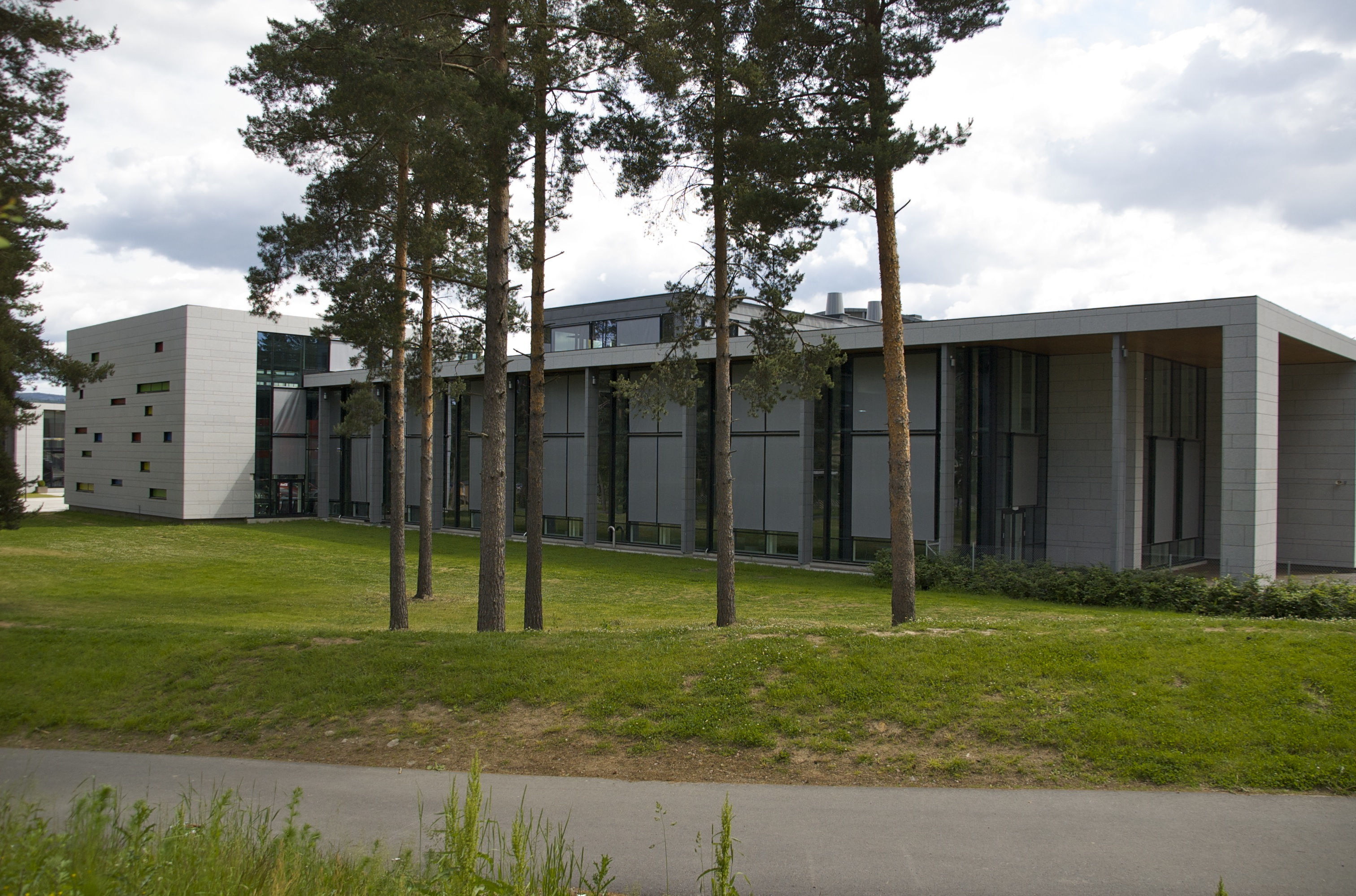
The outside of the public pool comprised in Skien Fritidspark.

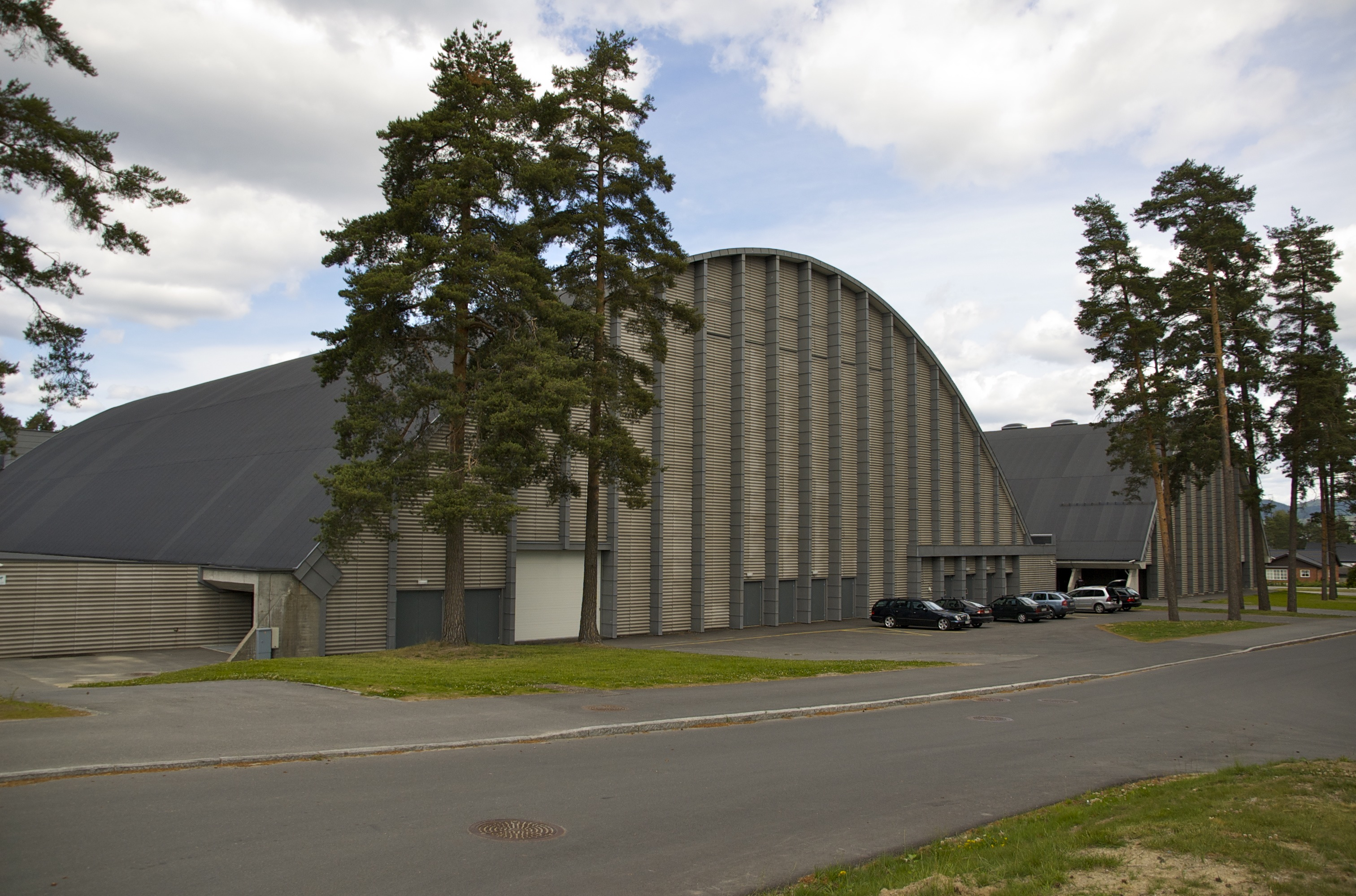
Skienshallen opened in 1968. A newer hall, Flerbrukshallen from 2008, in the background.
