= Melum =

Village in Skien Municipality, Norway

Melum Mælum (unofficial)
- Village
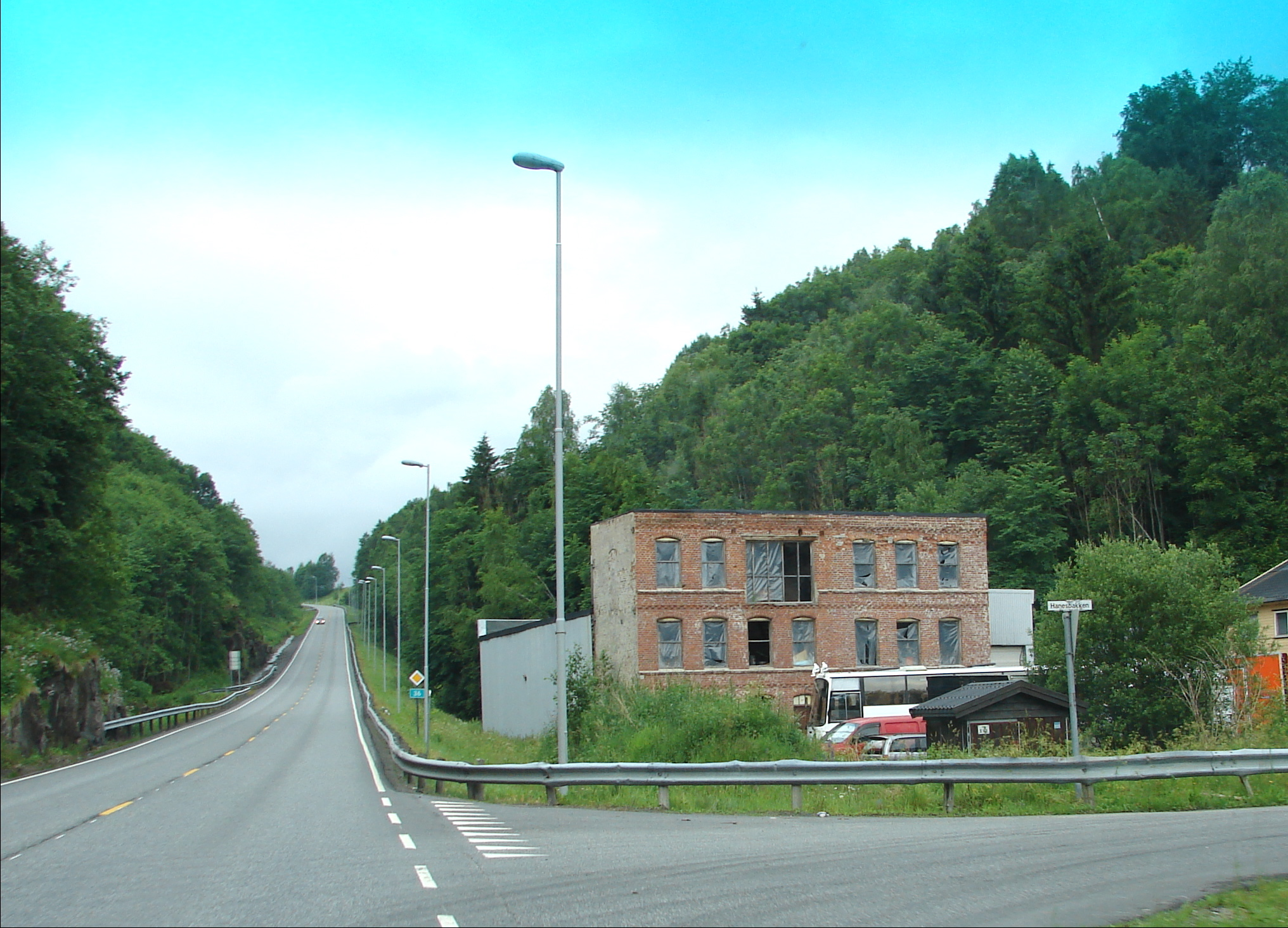
- View of the old mill in the village
- Interactive map of Melum
- Coordinates: 59.2104°N 9.41707°E
- Country: Norway
- Region: Eastern Norway
- County: Telemark
- District: Grenland
- Municipality: Skien Municipality
- Elevation: 41 m (135 ft)
- Time zone: UTC+01:00 (CET)
  - Summer (DST): UTC+02:00 (CEST)
- Post Code: 3729 Skien

Melum is a village in Skien Municipality in Telemark county, Norway. The village is located at the south end of the lake Norsjø, about 10 kilometres (6.2 mi) to the west of the town of Skien. The villages of Ulefoss and Helgja (in Nome Municipality) are located about 10 kilometres (6.2 mi) to the north and the village of Klovholt is located about 6 kilometres (3.7 mi) to the southeast. The Norwegian National Road 36 runs through the village.

Melum Church is located in the village. The village also has a school, a kindergarten, and a sports club.

== History ==
Melum was administratively a part of Solum Municipality from 1 January 1838 (when municipalities were established in Norway) until 1 January 1964 when it became part of Skien Municipality.
