= Solum Municipality =

Former municipality in Norway

Solum Municipality Solum herred
- Former municipality
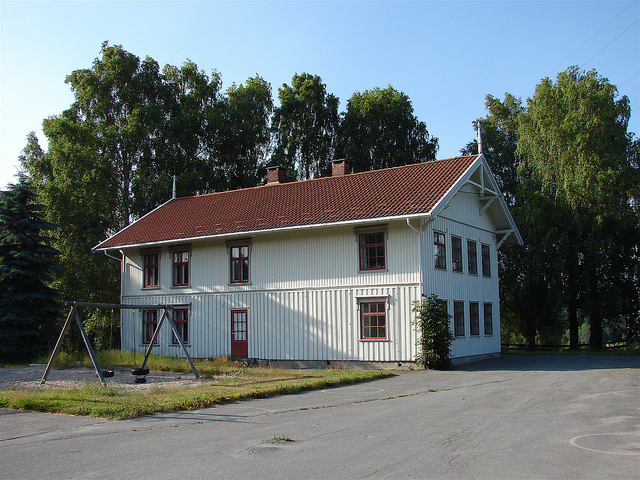
- View of the Klovholt school

- Telemark within Norway

- Solum within Telemark
- Coordinates: 59°10′23″N 9°33′32″E
- Country: Norway
- County: Telemark
- District: Grenland
- Established: 1 Jan 1838
  - Created as: Formannskapsdistrikt
- Disestablished: 1 Jan 1964
  - Succeeded by: Skien Municipality
- Administrative centre: Solum

Government
  - Mayor (1959–1963): Johan A. Kristensen (Ap)

Area (upon dissolution)
  - Total: 312.60 km^{2} (120.70 sq mi)
  - Rank: #275 in Norway
- Highest elevation (Vasslausfjellet): 386 m (1,266 ft)

Population (1963)
  - Total: 13,283
  - Rank: #41 in Norway
  - Density: 42.5/km^{2} (110/sq mi)
  - Change (10 years): ▲ +28.4%
- Demonym: Solumhering

Official language
  - Norwegian form: Bokmål
- Time zone: UTC+01:00 (CET)
  - Summer (DST): UTC+02:00 (CEST)
- ISO 3166 code: NO-0818

Solum (Norwegian pronunciation: [²suːlʉm]) is a former municipality in Telemark county, Norway. The 312.6-square-kilometre (120.7 sq mi) municipality existed from 1838 until its dissolution in 1964. The area is now part of Skien Municipality in the traditional district of Grenland. The administrative centre was the village of village of Solum, just south of Klovholt. Solum Church was the main church for the municipality. Solum Municipality was located west of the town of Skien, and encompassed districts such as Nenset, Tollnes, Flakvarp, Skotfoss, and Klyve.

Prior to its dissolution in 1964, the 312.6-square-kilometre (120.7 sq mi) municipality was the 275th largest by area out of the 689 municipalities in Norway. Solum Municipality was the 41st most populous municipality in Norway with a population of about 42.5. The municipality's population density was 42.5 inhabitants per square kilometre (110/sq mi) and its population had increased by 28.4% over the previous 10-year period.

== General information ==
=== Administrative history ===
The formannskapsdistrikt law of 1837 created a system of local government in Norway by establishing each town (ladested or kjøpstad) and each Church of Norway prestegjeld as a civil municipality. On 1 January 1838, Solum prestegjeld was established as Solum Municipality. According to the 1835 census, Solum prestegjeld had a population of about 3,557.

On 1 July 1916, an area of Solum Municipality (population: 1,042) was transferred into the neighboring Skien Municipality to the east. Then on 1 July 1920, a different area of Solum (population 1,614) was transferred into the neighboring Porsgrunn Municipality to the southeast.

During the 1960s, there were many municipal mergers across Norway due to the work of the Schei Committee. On 1 January 1964, Solum Municipality was dissolved and the following areas were merged to form an enlarged Skien Municipality:

- all of Solum Municipality (population: 13,706)
- all of Gjerpen Municipality (population: 15,300)
- all of Skien Municipality (population: 15,805)
- the Valebø area of Holla Municipality (population: 259)

=== Name ===
The municipality is named after the old Solum prestegjeld. The prestegjeld was named after the old Solum farm (Old Norse: Sólheimar) since the first Solum Church was built there. The first element is sól which means "sun" or "sunny". The last element is derived from the word heimr which means "village" or "abode".

=== Churches ===
The Church of Norway had three parishes (sokn) within Solum Municipality. At the time of the municipal dissolution, it was part of the Solum prestegjeld and the Skien prosti (deanery) in the Diocese of Agder.

Churches in Solum Municipality
Parish (sokn)	Church name	Location of the church	Year built
Solum	Solum Church	Solum	1766
Kilebygd	Kilebygda Church	Rognsbru	1859
Mælum	Melum Church	Mælum	1728
Mælum	Skotfoss Chapel	Skotfoss	1900

== Geography ==
The highest point in the municipality was a 386-metre (1,266 ft) point on the side of the mountain Vasslausfjellet (the peak was in the neighboring Holla Municipality). The southern part of the lake Norsjø was located in the eastern part of the municipality. Holla Municipality was located to the north, Gjerpen Municipality was located to the northeast and east, Skien Municipality was located to the east, Porsgrunn Municipality was located to the southeast, Bamble Municipality was located to the south, and Drangedal Municipality was located to the west.

== Government ==
While it existed, Solum Municipality was responsible for primary education (through 10th grade), outpatient health services, senior citizen services, welfare and other social services, zoning, economic development, and municipal roads and utilities. The municipality was governed by a municipal council of directly elected representatives. The mayor was indirectly elected by a vote of the municipal council. The municipality was under the jurisdiction of the Skien District Court and the Agder Court of Appeal.

=== Municipal council ===
The municipal council (Herredsstyre) of Solum Municipality was made up of representatives that were elected to four year terms. The tables below show the historical composition of the council by political party.

Solum herredsstyre 1959–1963
Party name (in Norwegian)	Number of representatives
Labour Party (Arbeiderpartiet)	28
Conservative Party (Høyre)	2
Communist Party (Kommunistiske Parti)	5
Christian Democratic Party (Kristelig Folkeparti)	4
Centre Party (Senterpartiet)	2
Liberal Party (Venstre)	7
Norwegian Social Democratic Party (Norsk sosialdemokratisk parti)	1
Total number of members:	49
Note: On 1 January 1964, Solum Municipality became part of Skien Municipality.

Solum herredsstyre 1955–1959
Party name (in Norwegian)	Number of representatives
Labour Party (Arbeiderpartiet)	27
Conservative Party (Høyre)	2
Communist Party (Kommunistiske Parti)	8
Christian Democratic Party (Kristelig Folkeparti)	4
Farmers' Party (Bondepartiet)	2
Liberal Party (Venstre)	6
Total number of members:	49

Solum herredsstyre 1951–1955
Party name (in Norwegian)	Number of representatives
Labour Party (Arbeiderpartiet)	26
Conservative Party (Høyre)	1
Communist Party (Kommunistiske Parti)	7
Christian Democratic Party (Kristelig Folkeparti)	4
Farmers' Party (Bondepartiet)	2
Liberal Party (Venstre)	8
Total number of members:	48

Solum herredsstyre 1947–1951
Party name (in Norwegian)	Number of representatives
Labour Party (Arbeiderpartiet)	19
Communist Party (Kommunistiske Parti)	12
Christian Democratic Party (Kristelig Folkeparti)	5
Farmers' Party (Bondepartiet)	1
Joint list of the Liberal Party (Venstre) and the Radical People's Party (Radikale Folkepartiet)	8
Joint List(s) of Non-Socialist Parties (Borgerlige Felleslister)	3
Total number of members:	48

Solum herredsstyre 1945–1947
Party name (in Norwegian)	Number of representatives
Labour Party (Arbeiderpartiet)	18
Communist Party (Kommunistiske Parti)	17
Christian Democratic Party (Kristelig Folkeparti)	5
Joint list of the Liberal Party (Venstre) and the Radical People's Party (Radikale Folkepartiet)	5
Joint List(s) of Non-Socialist Parties (Borgerlige Felleslister)	2
Local List(s) (Lokale lister)	1
Total number of members:	48

Solum herredsstyre 1937–1941*
Party name (in Norwegian)	Number of representatives
Labour Party (Arbeiderpartiet)	25
Liberal Party (Venstre)	12
Joint list of the Conservative Party (Høyre) and the Farmers' Party (Bondepartiet)	7
List of workers, fishermen, and small farmholders (Arbeidere, fiskere, småbrukere liste)	2
Joint List(s) of Non-Socialist Parties (Borgerlige Felleslister)	2
Total number of members:	48
Note: Due to the German occupation of Norway during World War II, no elections were held for new municipal councils until after the war ended in 1945.

=== Mayors ===
The mayor (Norwegian: ordfører) of Solum Municipality was the political leader of the municipality and the chairperson of the municipal council. The following people have held this position:

- 1838–1839: Hans Blom Cappelen, Sr.
- 1839–1847: Hans Nicolai Ørn
- 1847–1858: Hans Wilhelm Christopher Huitfeldt Wessel
- 1858–1863: Rev. Bent Wettergren
- 1863–1882: Diderik Cappelen (H)
- 1882–1885: Jens P. Tennefoss (V)
- 1885–1897: Hans Blom Capellen, Jr. (H)
- 1897–1898: Kjel Pedersen Skjelbred
- 1899–1901: Jens P. Tennefoss (V)
- 1902–1904: Kjel Pedersen Skjelbred
- 1905–1907: Olav Sannes (V)
- 1908–1910: Jacob Randinius Svensen Gisholt
- 1911–1916: Olav Nerisen Roe (Ap)
- 1917–1919: Thomas Adolf Weber
- 1920–1922: Jacob Randinius Svensen Gisholt
- 1923–1928: Simon Tennefoss
- 1929–1940: Thomas Adolf Weber
- 1941–1945: Gulbrand Romsås (NS)
- 1945–1945: Thomas Adolf Weber
- 1945–1945: Olaf M. Jensen
- 1946–1947: Johannes Landfald (NKP)
- 1948–1959: Tidemann Flaata Evensen (Ap)
- 1959–1963: Johan A. Kristensen (Ap)

== See also ==
- List of former municipalities of Norway
