= Klovholt =

Village in Skien Municipality, Norway

- Village
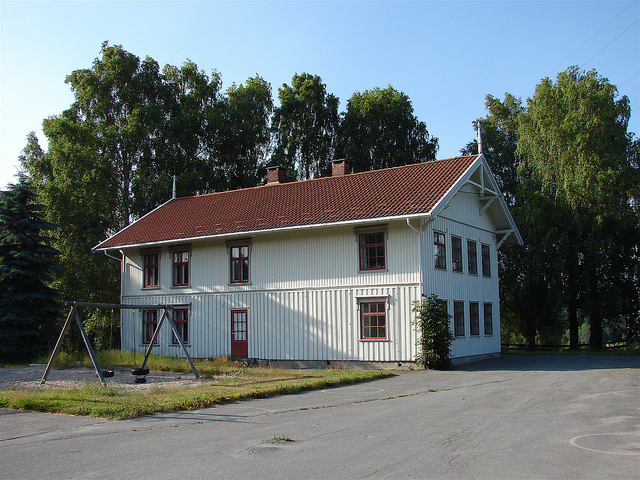
- View of the village school
- Interactive map of Klovholt
- Coordinates: 59.18423°N 9.52988°E
- Country: Norway
- Region: Eastern Norway
- County: Telemark
- District: Grenland
- Municipality: Skien Municipality
- Elevation: 57 m (187 ft)
- Time zone: UTC+01:00 (CET)
  - Summer (DST): UTC+02:00 (CEST)
- Post Code: 3729 Skien

Klovholt is a village in Skien Municipality in Telemark county, Norway. The village is located at the southern tip of the lake Norsjø. The village of Åfoss lies about 2 kilometres (1.2 mi) to the north, the village of Melum lies about 8 kilometres (5.0 mi) to the northwest, and the town of Skien lies about 4 kilometres (2.5 mi) to the east.

Klovholt is heavily wooded and one of its major exports is timber. Solum Church is located just south of the village.

== History ==
Klovholt was administratively a part of Solum Municipality from 1 January 1838 (when municipalities were established in Norway) until 1 January 1964 when it became part of Skien Municipality.
