= Åfoss =

Village in Skien Municipality, Norway

Åfoss Aafoss (historic)
- Village
- Interactive map of Åfoss
- Coordinates: 59.19789°N 9.53706°E
- Country: Norway
- Region: Eastern Norway
- County: Telemark
- District: Grenland
- Municipality: Skien Municipality
- Elevation: 66 m (217 ft)
- Time zone: UTC+01:00 (CET)
  - Summer (DST): UTC+02:00 (CEST)
- Post Code: 3731 Skien

Åfoss is a village in Skien Municipality in Telemark county, Norway. The village is located near the outlet of the lake Norsjø, just across the river from the village of Skotfoss. The village is located about 5 kilometres (3.1 mi) to the west of the town of Skien and about 2 kilometres (1.2 mi) to the north of the village of Klovholt.

== History ==
Åfoss was administratively a part of Solum Municipality from 1 January 1838 (when municipalities were established in Norway) until 1 January 1964 when it became part of Skien Municipality.
