= Robot Aviation =

Norwegian aerospace company

- Formation: 2008
- Founder: Ole Vidar Homleid, Oddvar Kristiansen
- Founded at: Gjøvik in Oppland in Norway
- Type: Private
- Headquarters: Eggemoen Aviation & Technology park, Norway
- Region served: Worldwide
- Services: Unmanned Aircraft Systems
- Staff: 50 people (April 2018)
- Website: http://www.robotaviation.com/

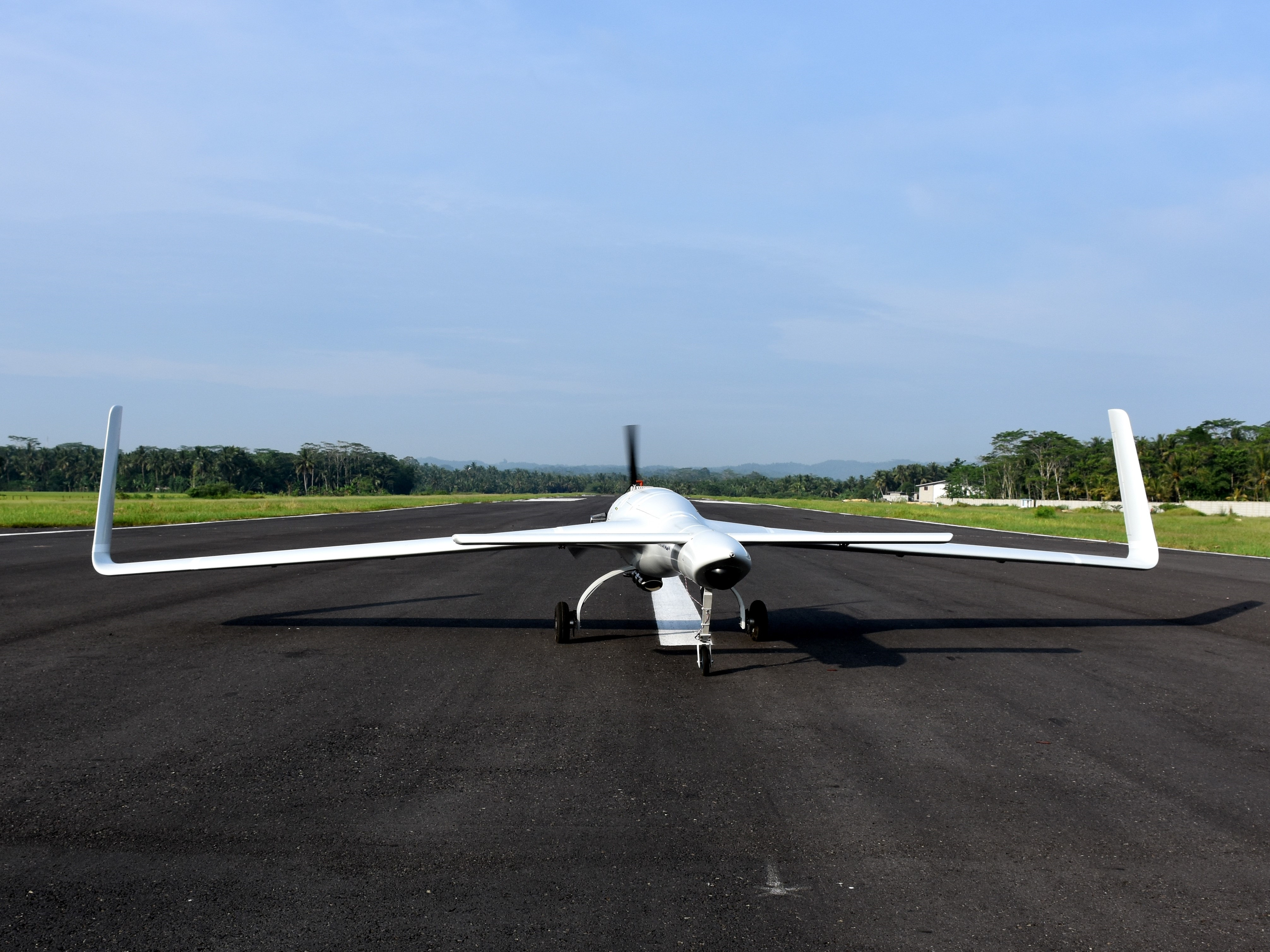
SkyRobot FX450

Robot Aviation is an aerospace company that supplies unmanned aircraft systems (UAS) for military and commercial use. The company is headquartered at Eggemoen Aviation & Technology Park in the Oslo region, Norway with development and production facilities in Warsaw, Poland and Linköping in Sweden (UAS Europe). Robot Aviation is also established in the US with offices in Grand Forks in North Dakota and Phoenix in Arizona.

The unmanned systems are designed to operate under challenging conditions with extensive endurance and range. The company's product line includes both unmanned helicopters and fixed-wing aircraft.

== History ==
Robot Aviation was founded in 2008 in Gjøvik in Oppland in Norway by Ole Vidar Homleid and Oddvar Kristiansen. Although the company's official address was at Gjøvik, development and production of the first SkyRobot prototype (FX450) started at Skotfoss in Skien, Telemark in cooperation with the company Aero-Design of Paweł Różański from Warsaw, Poland.

In May 2018 Robot Aviation acquired the company UAS Europe. Their NATO STANAG 4586 compliant SkyView ground control station software for unmanned systems has been used by more than 30 companies and organizations all over the world. UAS-Europe is located in Scandinavia's aviation hub, Linköping in Sweden.

The existing unmanned aircraft fixed-wing systems of Robot Aviation - SkyRobot FX20 and SkyRobot FX450 will be complemented by Spy Owl 200 by UAS Europe under the name SkyRobot FX10.

Robot Aviation together with Telenor and Andøya Space Center are joining forces to develop and test SkyRobot FX450 to improve preparedness in Arctic environment of Svalbard. Start-up for the project is planned in 2018.

== Products ==
- SkyRobot FX10 – a hand launched fixed wing UAS with a maximum take-off weight (MTOW) of 6,5 kg (14.5 lb) and with a payload of up to 2.7 kg (6 lb), optimized for agriculture, research and surveillance applications.
- SkyRobot FX20 – a high performance fixed wing UAS with a maximum take-off weight (MTOW) of 12 kg (26 lb) and long endurance with a payload of up to 3 kg (6.6 lb), optimized for surveillance and monitoring applications.
- SkyRobot FX450 – a long endurance fixed wing UAS with a MTOW of 180 kg (400 lb) and a payload up to 100 kg (220 lb), developed for surveillance and monitoring applications over both land and sea.
- Launch and Recovery System developed for SkyRobot FX20 and similar types of unmanned aircraft
- SkyView – NATO STANAG 4586 compliant ground control station including software.
- SkyRobot RX55 – an unmanned helicopter designed with the goal of fulfilling safety regulations for UAVs weighing less than 25 kg (55 lb) with a payload up to 8 kg (18 lb).
- SkyRobot RX100 – an all-round unmanned helicopter suitable for heavier loads and longer flight times.
