= Skotfoss Church =

Church in Telemark, Norway

- Skotfoss kirke
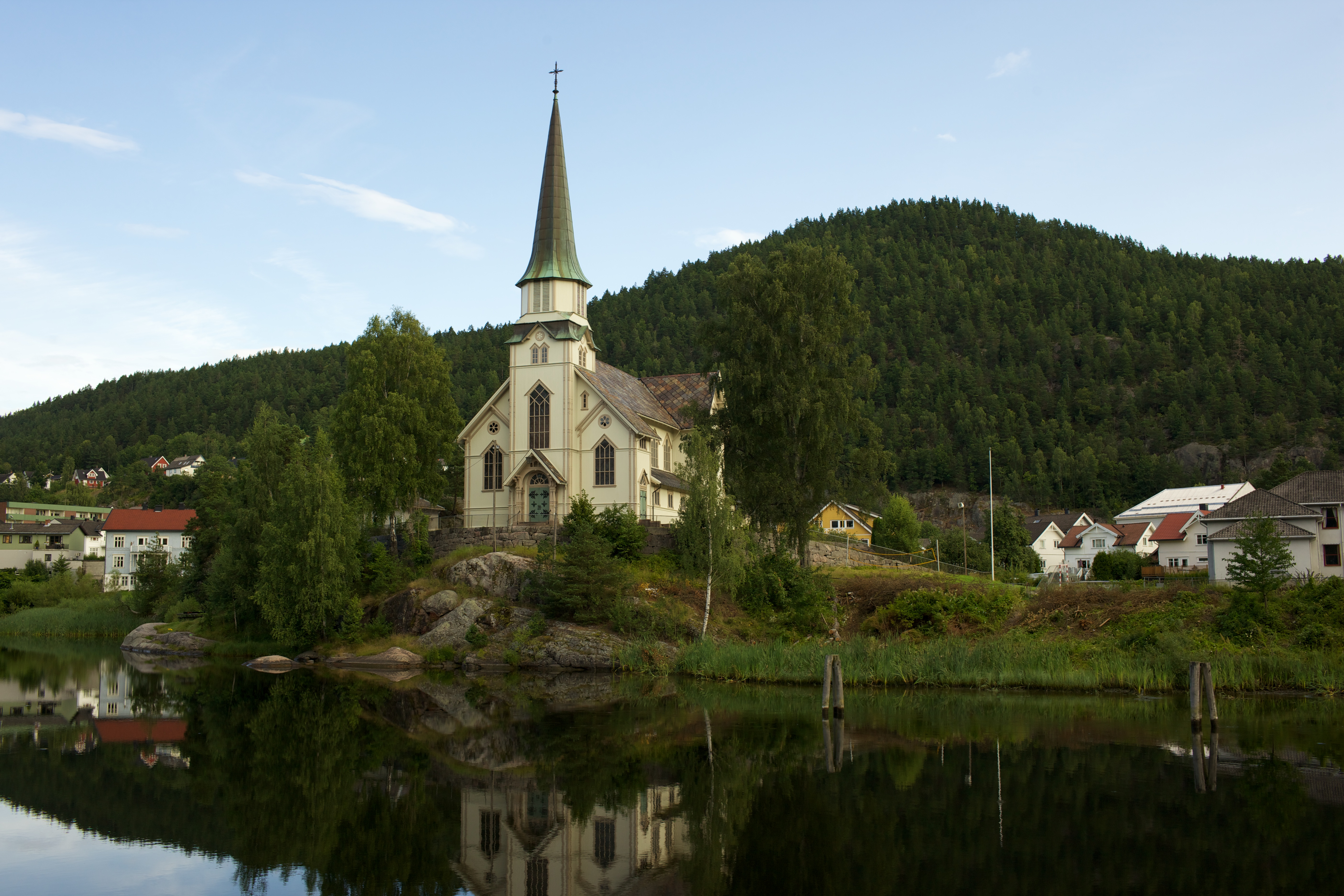
- View of the church
- Skotfoss Church
- 59°12′50″N 9°31′31″E
- Location: Skien Municipality, Telemark
- Country: Norway
- Denomination: Church of Norway
- Churchmanship: Evangelical Lutheran

History
- Status: Parish church
- Founded: 1900
- Consecrated: 6 December 1900

Architecture
- Functional status: Active
- Architect: Haldor Børve
- Architectural type: Long church
- Completed: 1900 (126 years ago)

Specifications
- Capacity: 420
- Materials: Wood

Administration
- Diocese: Agder og Telemark
- Deanery: Skien prosti
- Parish: Gulset og Skotfoss
- Norwegian Cultural Heritage Site
- Type: Church
- Status: Listed
- ID: 85477

Skotfoss Church (Norwegian: Skotfoss kirke) is a parish church of the Church of Norway in Skien Municipality in Telemark county, Norway. It is located in the village of Skotfoss. It is one of the churches for the Gulset og Skotfoss parish which is part of the Skien prosti (deanery) in the Diocese of Agder og Telemark. The white, wooden church was built in a long church design in 1900 using plans drawn up by the architect Haldor Børve. The church seats about 420 people.

== History ==
The rural areas of Skotfoss were historically part of the Melum Church parish. During the 19th century, the Norske Skog Union opened the Skotfoss Bruk paper mill which attracted many workers to the area. During the 1890s, plans were made for a new church in Skotfoss to serve the growing population. The church was designed by Haldor Børve and the carpentry work was carried out by the workers from the local factory. The building was designed as a long church, somewhat reminiscent of a medieval stave church. From the exterior it almost looks like a cruciform design, but it is not set up that way in the interior. The church has a tower at the entrance to the south and to the north it has a choir which is surrounded by small vestries. The new church was consecrated on 6 December 1900 by the Bishop Johan Christian Heuch.

== Media gallery ==
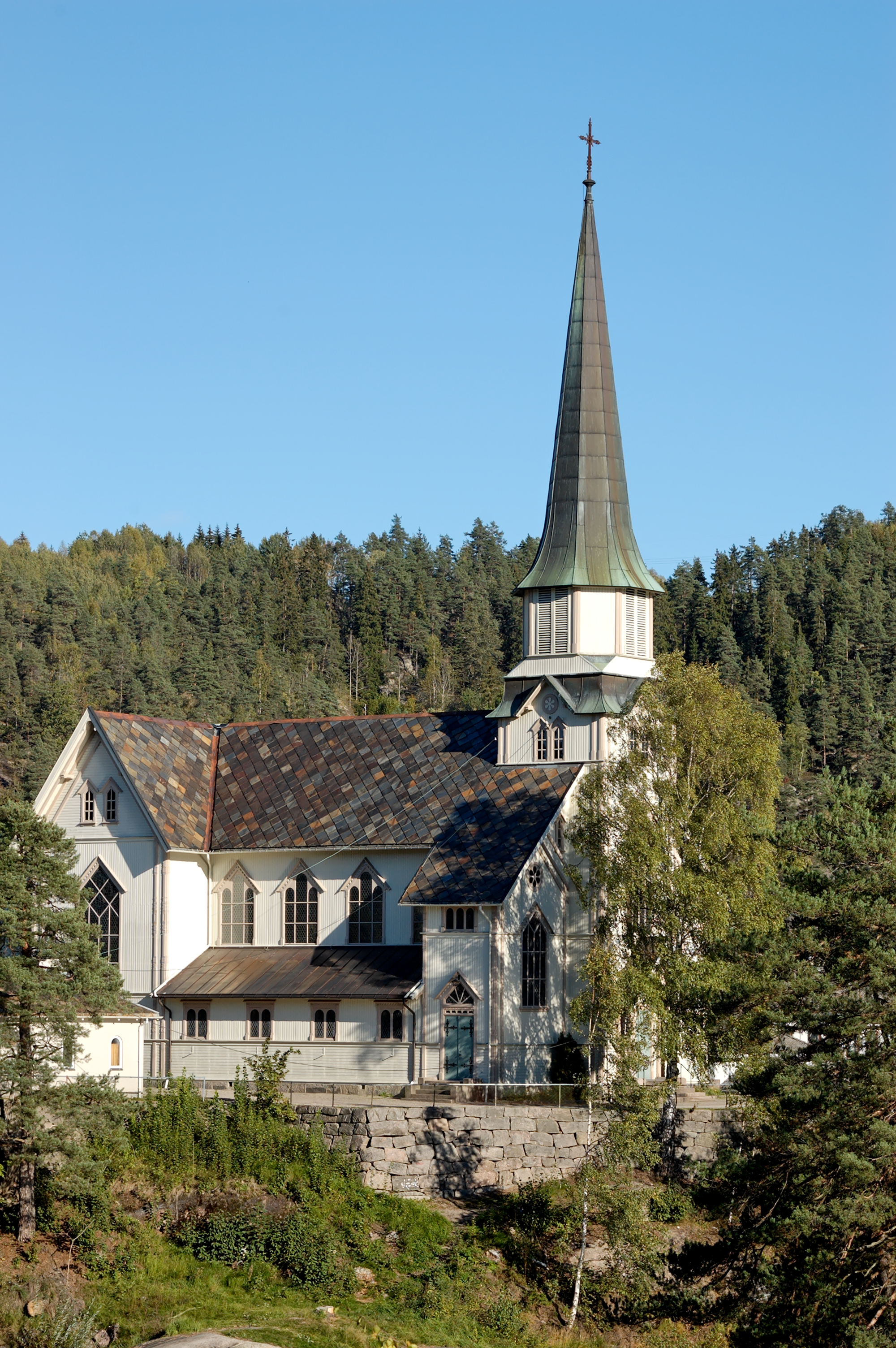

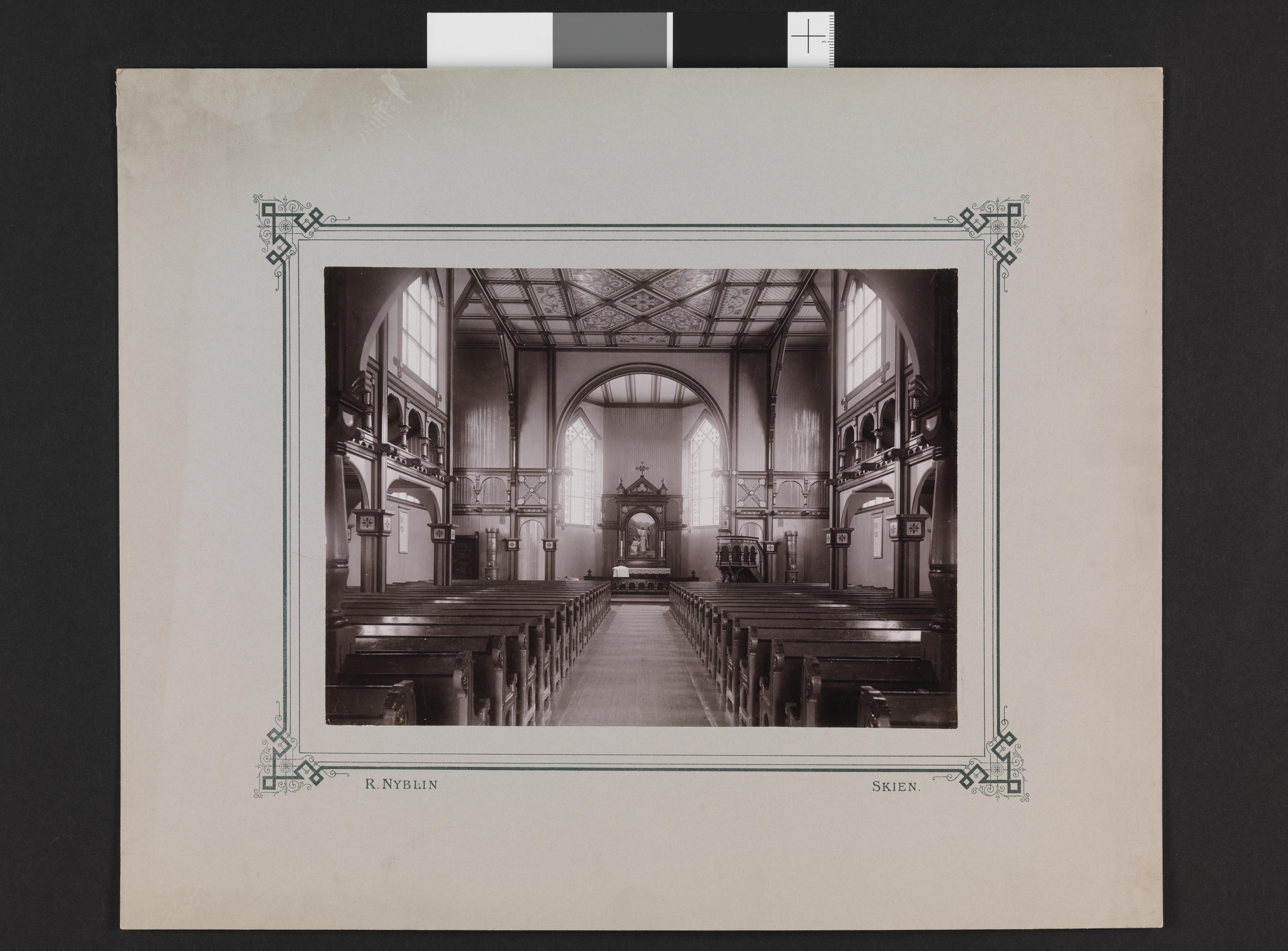

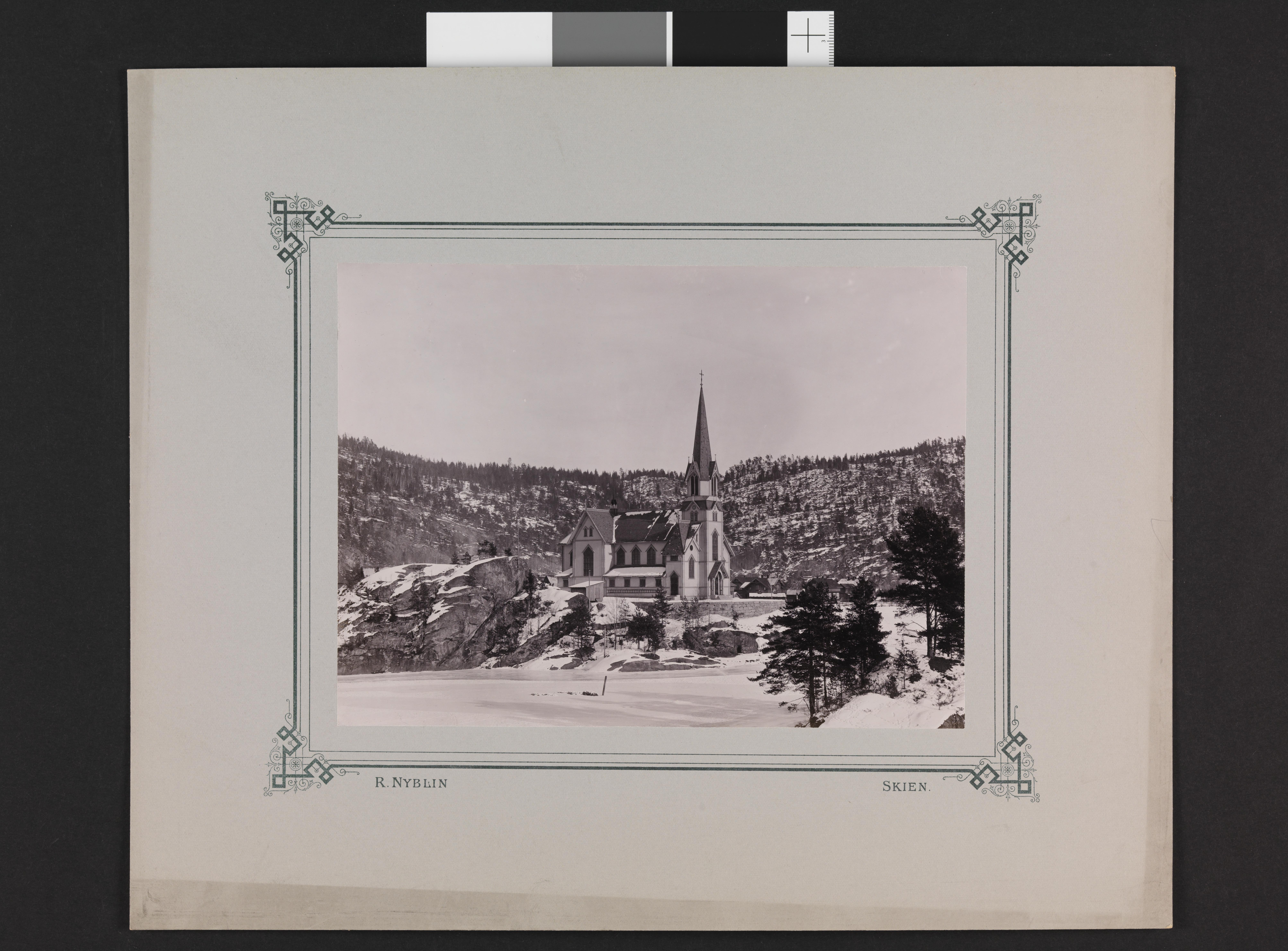

== See also ==
- List of churches in Agder og Telemark
