= Tor Arne Sannerholt =

Norwegian footballer (born 1967)

Personal information
- Date of birth: 12 December 1967 (age 58)
- Position: Midfielder

Youth career
- Skotfoss
- –1985: Odd

Senior career*
Years	Team	Apps	(Gls)
1985–1988	Odd		
1989–1991	Kongsvinger	36	(1)
1991–1997	Odd		
1995	→ Strømsgodset (loan)		
1998	Strømsgodset	14	(1)
1999	Odd	11	(0)
2000–2001	Tollnes		
2002–2003	Pors		
2004–?	Herkules		
2005	Notodden		

Managerial career
- 2002–2003: Pors (playing assistant)
- 2004–?: Herkules (playing manager)
- 2006: Odd (junior coach)
- 2007–2009: Herkules (co-coach/assistant)
- 2011: Skotfoss (assistant)
- 2012: Fossum (consulting coach)
- 2014–2016: Skotfoss (co-coach)
- 2017–2018: Tollnes (assistant)
- * Club domestic league appearances and goals

Tor Arne Sannerholt (born 12 December 1967) is a retired Norwegian football midfielder and later manager.

Growing up in the club Skotfoss, he moved to Odd as a junior player, helped win the 1985 Norwegian Junior Cup and was also drafted into the first team. After three seasons in Odd he was bought by Kongsvinger. Here he played a majority of the games in 1989 and 1990, but few in 1991. He had a row with manager Svein Ivar Sigernes and returned to a long spell in Odd.

He was loaned by Strømsgodset in 1995 to secure promotion from the 1995 1. divisjon, and later made a permanent transfer in 1998. During both spells, he commuted by car between Skien and Drammen. Sannerholt has admitted to smoking eight cigarettes on each car ride, and commented on his lack of professionalism at the time. In May 1998 he received a five-match ban after being red-carded and allegedly making post-match verbal threats toward the referee. After the season was deemed surplus by Strømsgodset's chairman and was let go, only to return to Odd one more time. He did not win a regular team spot and went on to lesser local clubs Tollnes and Pors.

While playing for Pors, Sannerholt was also assistant manager under Dag-Eilev Fagermo. His first head coach position was as player-manager of IF Herkules from 2004. In 2005 he joined Dag-Eilev Fagermo's new club Notodden FK as an emergency backup player. In 2006 he coached Odd's junior team, but left and returned to Herkules. This time he left in the summer of 2009.

His first stint as assistant in Skotfoss TIF came in 2011. He then went to Fossum's women's team as consulting coach. Ahead of the 2014 season he became co-coach of Skotfoss TIF Ahead of the 2017 season he became assistant of Tollnes BK under Kai David Elvenes; the former 1. divisjon club wanting to regain some of its former glory. This spell lasted for two seasons.
