= Skotfoss TIF =

Norwegian sports club

- Full name: Skotfoss Turn- og Idrettsforening
- Founded: 29 December 1899
- Ground: Skotfoss stadion, Skotfoss

Skotfoss Turn- og Idrettsforening is a Norwegian multi-sports club from Skotfoss, Skien, Telemark. It has sections for association football, gymnastics and Nordic skiing.

The club was founded on 29 December 1899. The club colours are white with red, white and blue.

The men's football team was contesting the 2017 4. divisjon until pulling its team from competition. It was formerly a staple in the 3. divisjon, with a presence for most of the 1990s until 1998, and from 2001 through 2010 with a last appearance in 2012. It is also known as the childhood club of Frode Johnsen and Tor Arne Sannerholt.
