= Skotfoss =

Village in Skien Municipality, Norway

- Village
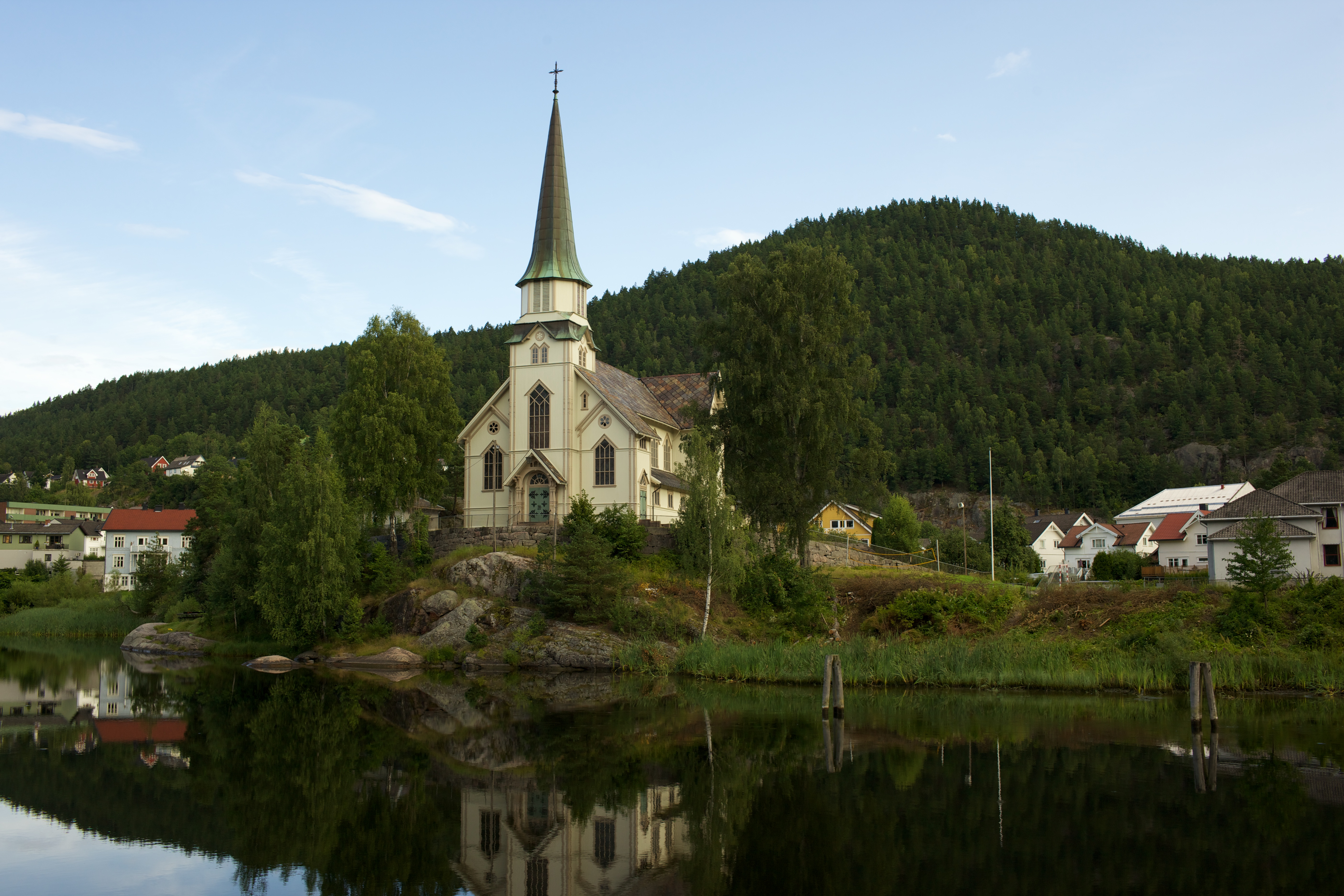
- View of the Skotfoss Church, built in 1900 by workers at Skotfoss Bruk and paid for by the Papermaking Union
- Interactive map of Skotfoss
- Coordinates: 59.21506°N 9.52451°E
- Country: Norway
- Region: Eastern Norway
- County: Telemark
- District: Grenland
- Municipality: Skien Municipality
- Elevation: 11 m (36 ft)
- Time zone: UTC+01:00 (CET)
  - Summer (DST): UTC+02:00 (CEST)
- Post Code: 3720 Skien

Skotfoss is a village in Skien Municipality in Telemark county, Norway. The village is located along the river Farelva where lake Norsjø feeds into the Skien watershed. It is located across the river from the village of Åfoss. It is located about 6 kilometres (3.7 mi) west of the town of Skien. The village has a population of about 1,700 people.

Skotfoss Church is located in the village.

== History ==
The village of Skotfoss was built up around the waterfall and its associated industry. Skotfoss was a part of Solum Municipality until the municipalities of Solum and Skien were merged on 1 January 1964. Skottfoss used to be home to one of North Europe's biggest paper factories, Skotfoss Bruk. Paper from the factory was exported around the world, including to New York City where the paper was used by The New York Times. The factory closed in 1986.

The sports association Skotfoss TIF was founded in 1899. The Norwegian soccer player Frode Johnsen, who grew up in the village, has played for the association's soccer team.
