= Skien animal =

Ancient Norwegian wood carving

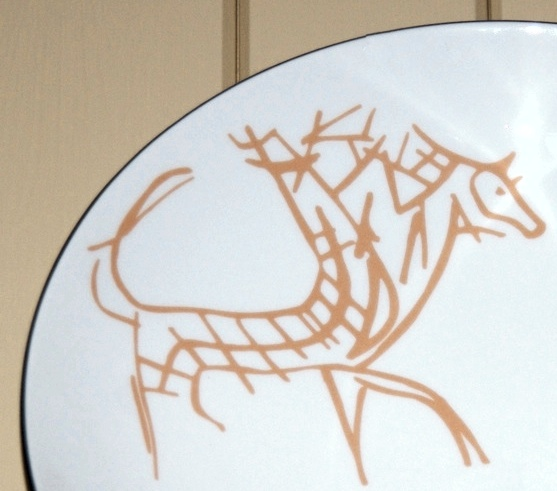
The Skien animal, here as a reproduction painted on a porcelain plate. Photo: Rune Mathisen

The Skien animal was found during an excavation in Skien, Norway, in 1979. It is carved into a plank, and is dated to the 9th century. This, and other findings, show that Skien was a trading centre from before year 1000, and Skien was therefore celebrating its 1000-year jubilee in the year 2000.

The Skien animal has three heads, one looking backwards, one looking to the side and one looking forward. One possible interpretation of this symbol is that one should both focus on our history (backwards), at the present (sideways), and into the future (forward).
