= Solum Church =

Church in Telemark, Norway

- Solum kirke
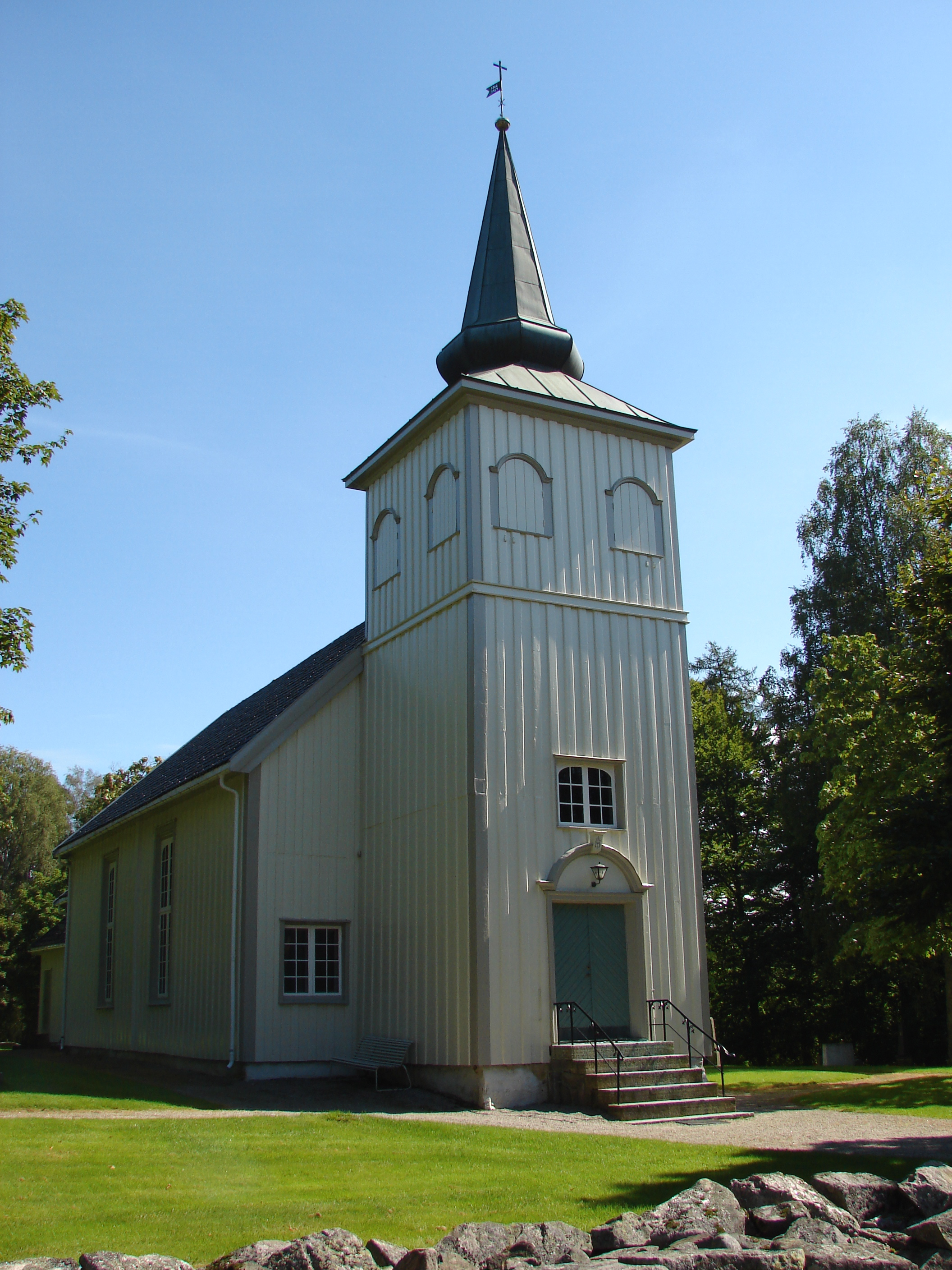
- View of the church
- Solum Church
- 59°10′23″N 9°33′32″E
- Location: Skien Municipality, Telemark
- Country: Norway
- Denomination: Church of Norway
- Previous denomination: Catholic Church
- Churchmanship: Evangelical Lutheran

History
- Status: Parish church
- Founded: 13th century
- Consecrated: 5 July 1766

Architecture
- Functional status: Active
- Architect: Joen Jacobsen
- Architectural type: Long church
- Completed: 1766 (260 years ago)

Specifications
- Capacity: 205
- Materials: Wood

Administration
- Diocese: Agder og Telemark
- Deanery: Skien prosti
- Parish: Kilebygda og Solum
- Norwegian Cultural Heritage Site
- Type: Church
- Status: Automatically protected
- ID: 85521

Solum Church (Norwegian: Solum kirke) is a parish church of the Church of Norway in Skien Municipality in Telemark county, Norway. It is located in the village of Solum, just west of the town of Skien. It is one of the churches for the Kilebygda og Solum parish which is part of the Skien prosti (deanery) in the Diocese of Agder og Telemark. The white, wooden church was built in a long church design in 1766 by the builder Joen Jacobsen. The church seats about 205 people.

== History ==
The earliest existing historical records of the church date back to the year 1349, but the church was not built that year. The first church in Solum was a wooden stave church that may have been built in the 13th century. The old church was located about 50 metres (160 ft) to the north of the present church building. The old church was dedicated to John the Baptist. Not much is known about the old church, but it was said to be pretty dark, with only one window in the building. In 1580, a new timber-framed choir was added onto the church. In 1723, the church was sold into private ownership during the Norwegian church sale when the King sold the churches to pay off debts from the Great Northern War. At that time, the church was not in good condition, but the new owner, Peder Alstrup, was unable to afford to fix up the building. In 1765, the church was sold to the county governor, Frederik Georg Adeler. The new owner immediately tore down the building and began constructing a new church. The new Solum church was built by master builder Joen Jacobsen. The building was consecrated on 5 July 1766 by the Bishop Fredrik Nannestad. The building is a long church built out of log construction with exterior paneled siding. The main nave has a choir to the east and a bell tower on the west end.

In 1814, this church served as an election church (Norwegian: valgkirke). Together with more than 300 other parish churches across Norway, it was a polling station for elections to the 1814 Norwegian Constituent Assembly which wrote the Constitution of Norway. This was Norway's first national elections. Each church parish was a constituency that elected people called "electors" who later met together in each county to elect the representatives for the assembly that was to meet at Eidsvoll Manor later that year.

In 1824, the Adeler family sold the church to Diderik von Cappelen. A few years later, the new owners decided to fix up the church and they paid for some large repairs as well as new paint for the building. In 1832 or 1833, the bell tower blew down. It was rebuilt in 1833, but the new tower was a little lower and given a more pyramidal-shaped top. The church was given to the municipality in 1854. In 1896 it was remodeled to make it look more modern. The interior walls were paneled and painted, the ceiling paintings were covered over with paint, and the old furnishings were removed. In 1902, the tower was rebuilt again, making it higher, with a tall point, and giving it a neo-Gothic. In 1957–1959, the church was restored again according to plans by Ragnar Nilsen. He tried to bring back the historic look with the old interior design and furnishings being brought back. During this project, the bell tower was also rebuilt to bring it back to the same look as the 1830s tower. The church was re-consecrated on 14 June 1959.

== Media gallery ==
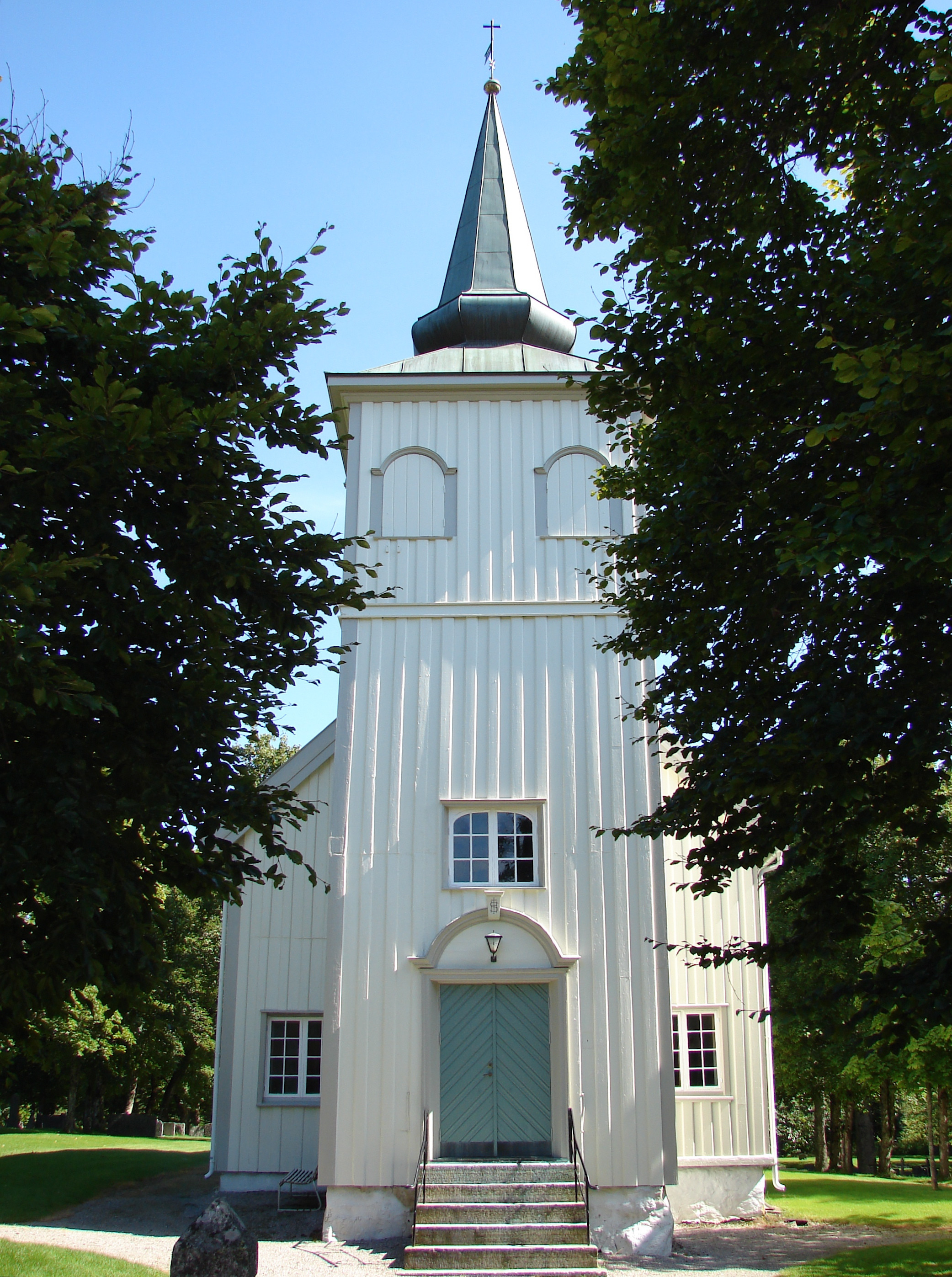

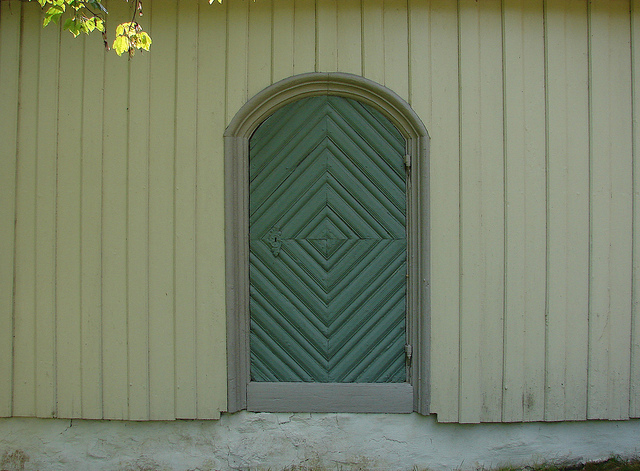

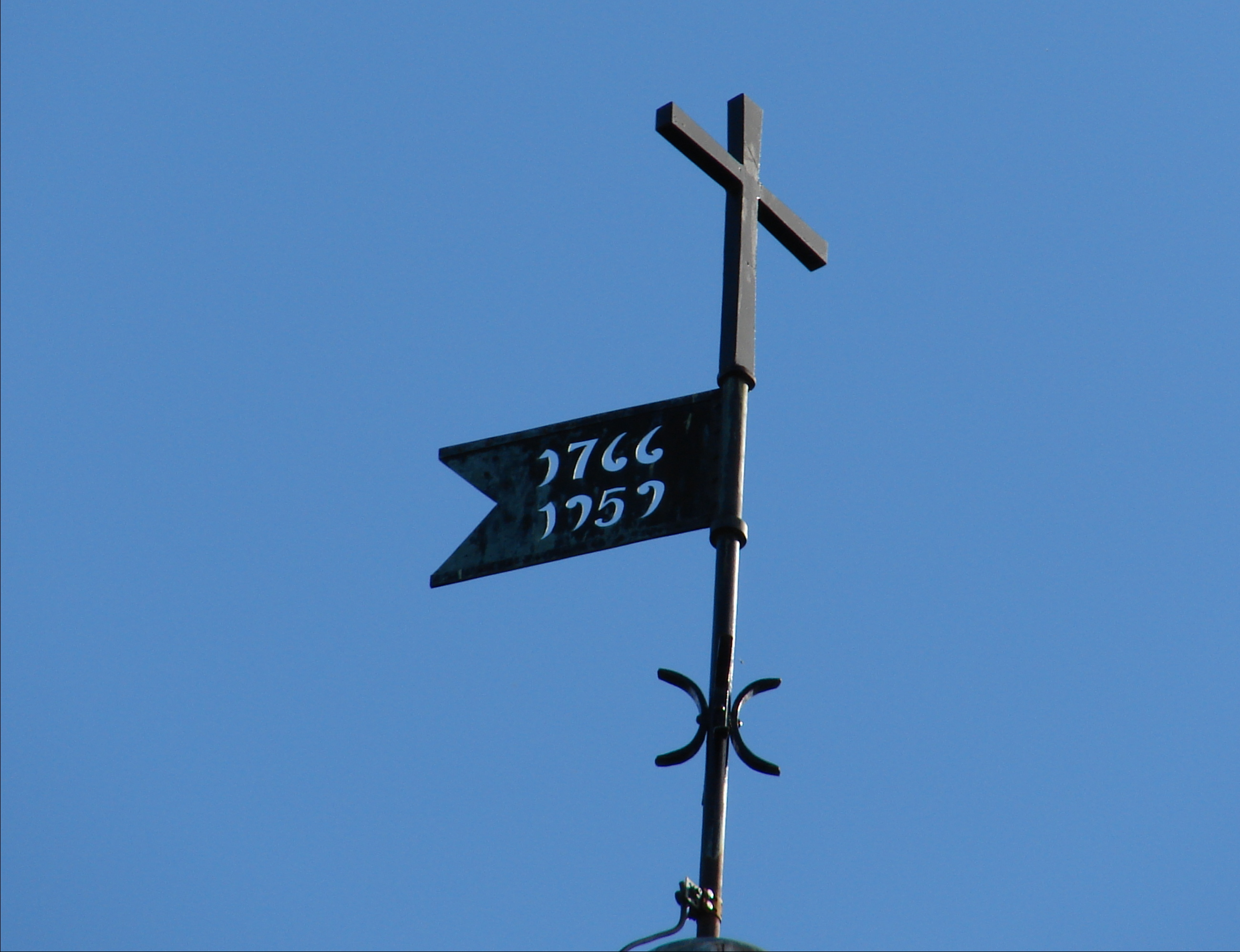

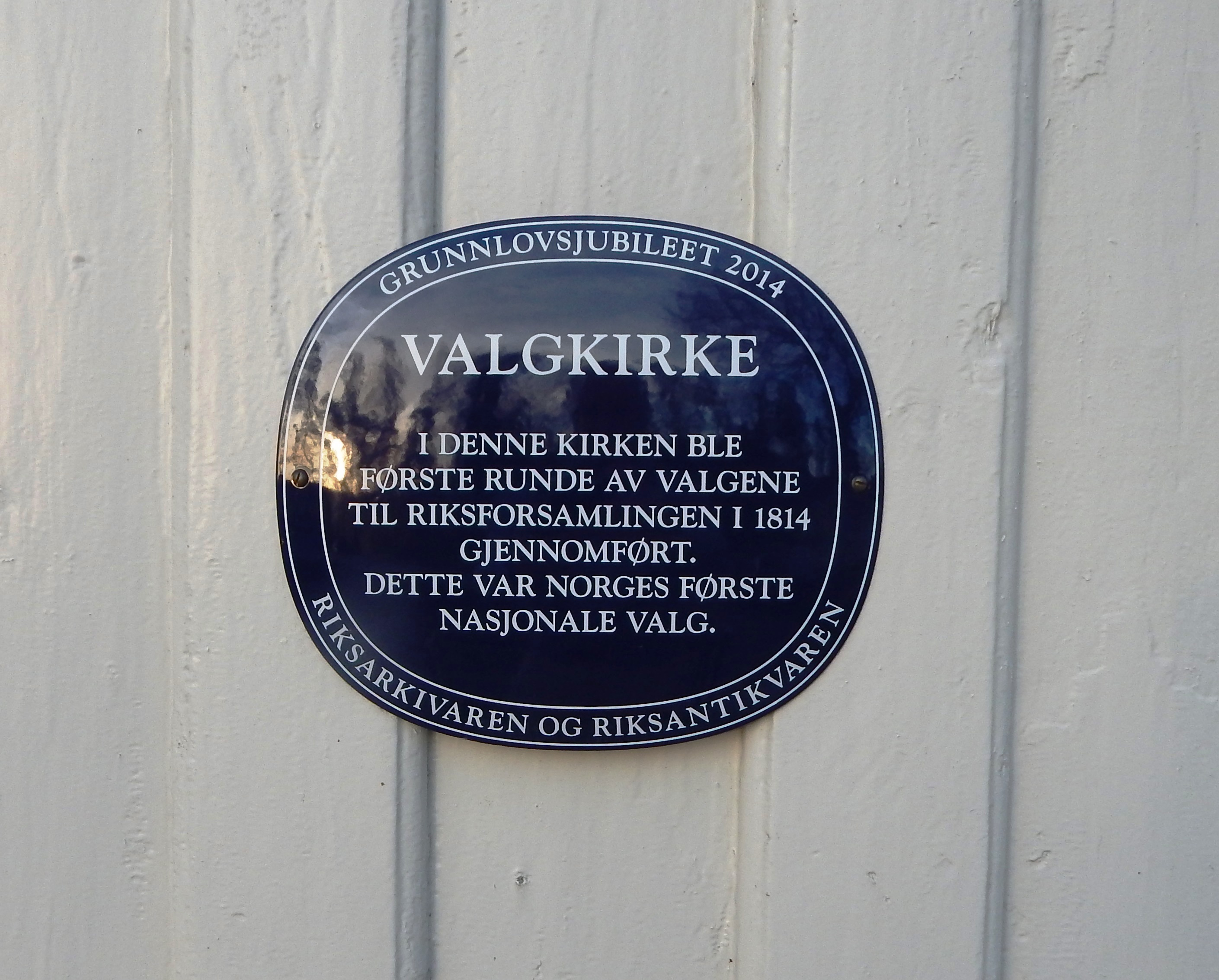

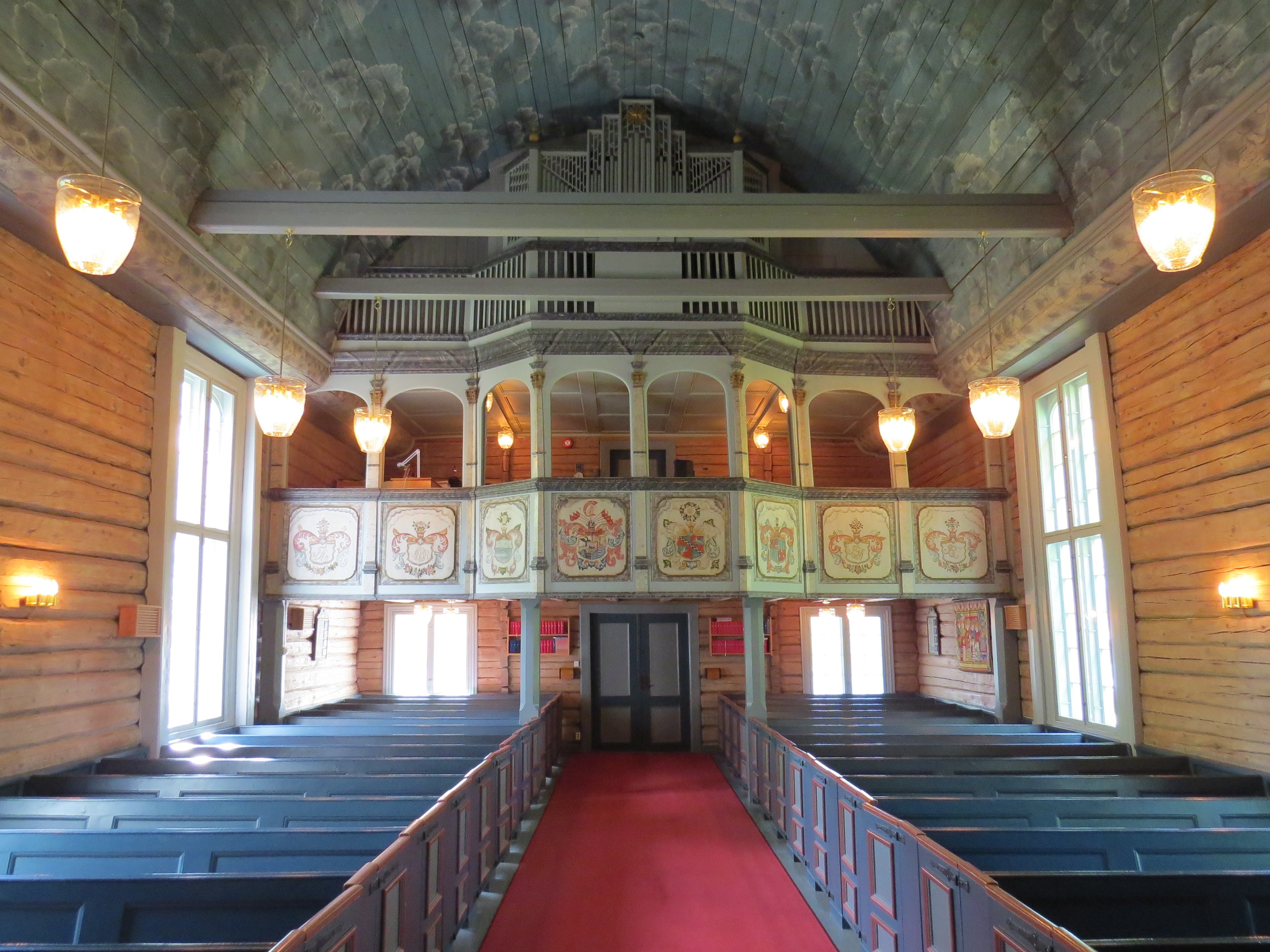

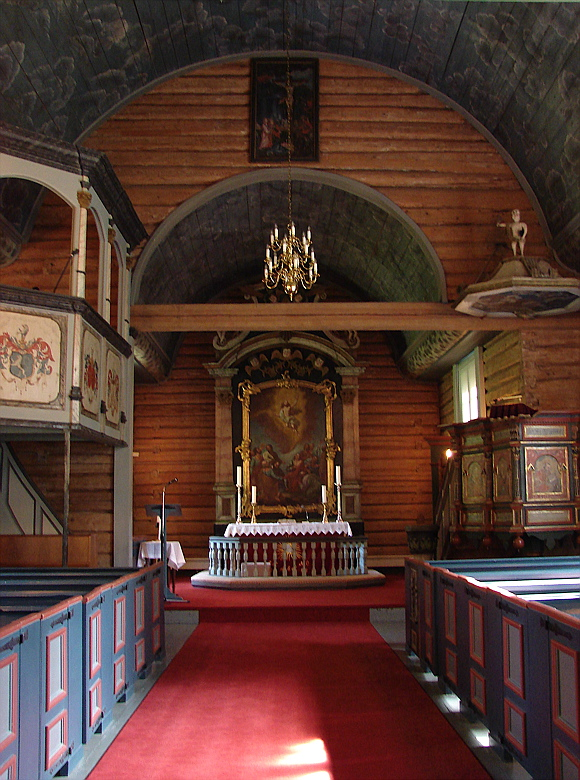

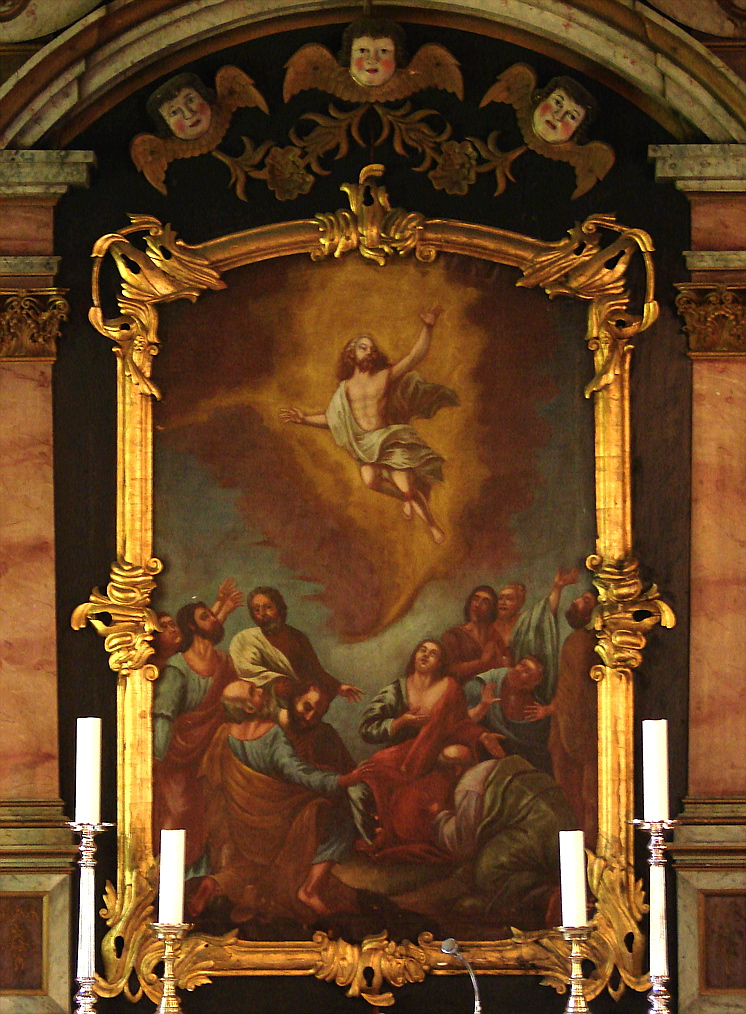

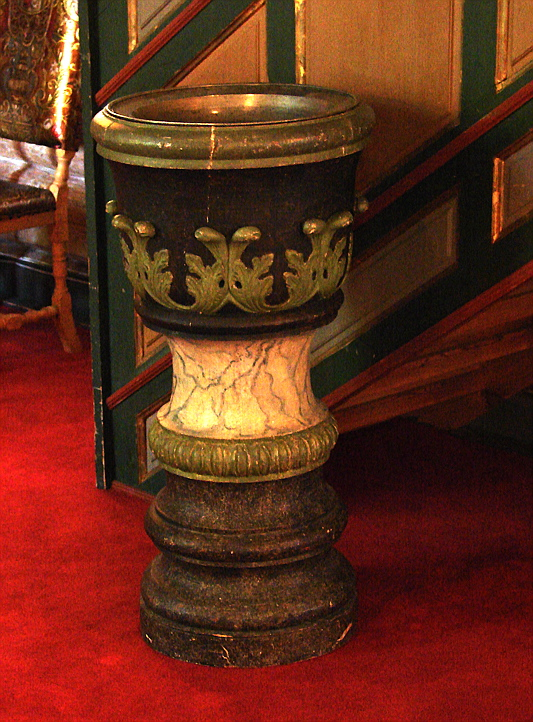

== See also ==
- List of churches in Agder og Telemark
