= Skotfoss Bruk =

Paper mill in Skien, Norway

Coordinates: 59°12′34″N 9°31′34″E

Skotfoss Bruk was a paper mill located in Skotfoss, Skien, Norway. The mill was part of the Union Co., founded in 1890. It closed production on 31 December 1986.

The first electric industrial railway in Norway opened in 1892 at Skotfoss Bruk.
