= Skien (town) =

Town in Skien, Norway

- Town/City
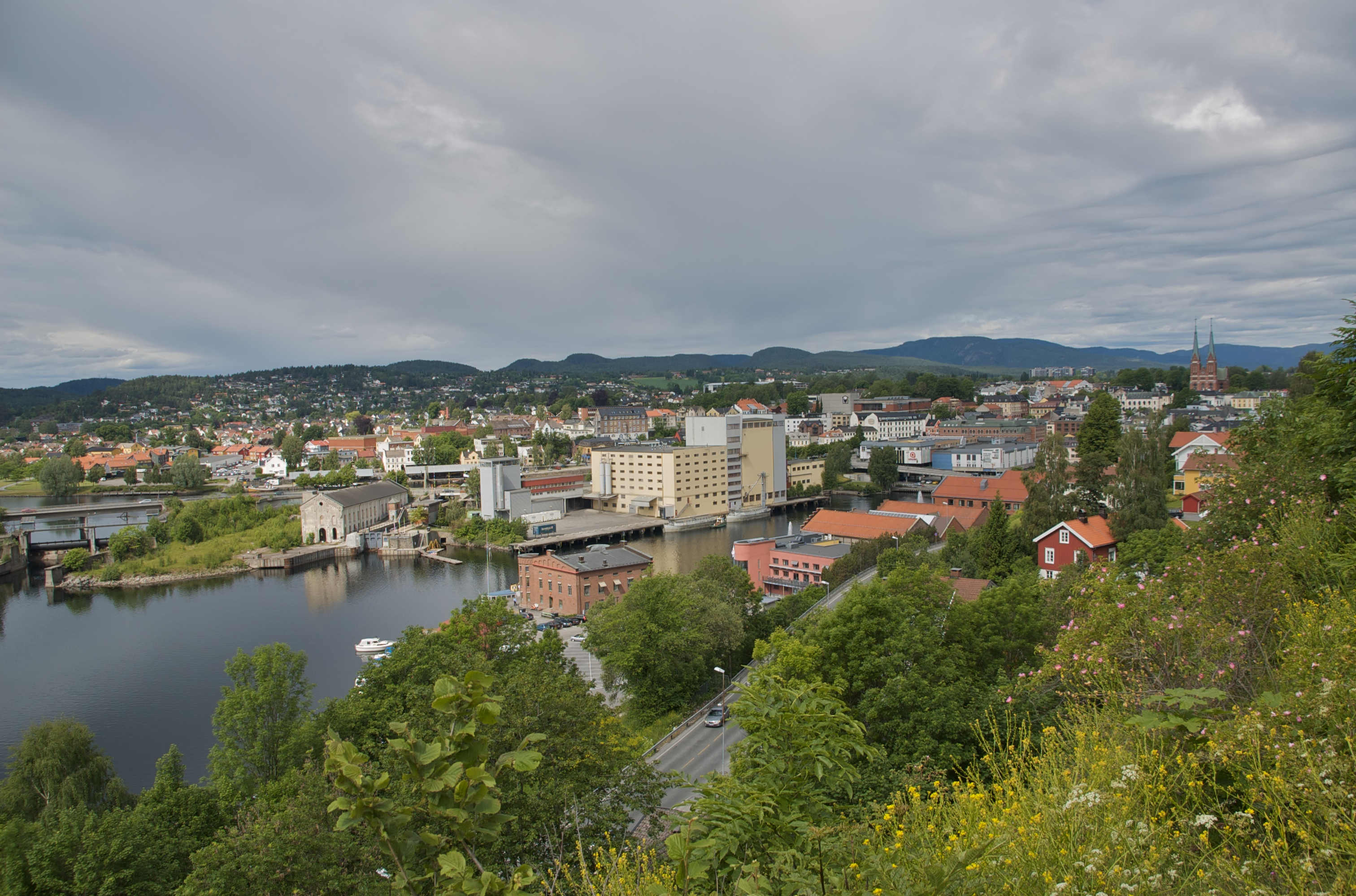
- View of the town
- Nickname: Ibsenbyen ("Town of Ibsen")
- Interactive map of Skien
- Coordinates: 59.20961°N 9.60901°E
- Country: Norway
- Region: Eastern Norway
- County: Telemark
- District: Grenland
- Municipality: Skien Municipality
- Established as
- Kjøpstad: 1358

Area
  - Total: 26.66 km^{2} (10.29 sq mi)
- Elevation: 14 m (46 ft)

Population (2025)
  - Total: 51,527
  - Density: 1,933/km^{2} (5,010/sq mi)
- Part of Porsgrunn/Skien
- Demonyms: Skiensmann (male); Skienskvinne (female); Skiensfolk
- Time zone: UTC+01:00 (CET)
  - Summer (DST): UTC+02:00 (CEST)
- Post Code: 3715 Skien

Skien (Norwegian: [¹ʃiː.ən]) is a town/city in Skien Municipality in Telemark county, Norway. It is the administrative centre of the municipality. The town is located along the Skienselva river, about 8 kilometres (5.0 mi) to the northwest of the town of Porsgrunn. The villages of Skotfoss, Åfoss, and Klovholt are located about 5 kilometres (3.1 mi) to the west of the town, the village of Sneltvedt lies about 2 kilometres (1.2 mi) to the east of the town, and the village of Hoppestad lies about 6 kilometres (3.7 mi) to the northwest.

The town is part of the Porsgrunn/Skien metropolitan area, so Statistics Norway does not track the population of the town separately. The portion of the urban area within Skien Municipality is 26.66-square-kilometre (6,590-acre) and it has a population (2025) of 51,527 and a population density of 1,933 inhabitants per square kilometre (5,010/sq mi).

Skien city center is located where the river Farelva (from the lake Norsjø) forms the lake Hjellevatnet, and it divides into a waterfall on each side of the island of Klosterøya. The harbor basin is located at the northern part of the river Skienselva. The hilly terrain makes the center of Skien crowded with a main north-south axis. The city got its current road alignment and layout after the last big city fire in 1886.

Skien is the seat of the county governor and the Telemark County Municipality. The town also has the Telemark Hospital Trust and a number of secondary schools. There is a prison at Rødmyr, a jogging track at Klosterskogen, and a sports and swimming hall (Skienshallen). The newspapers Telemarksavisa and Varden are published in the city.

== History ==
Skien is one of Norway's oldest cities, with an urban history dating back to the Middle Ages, and received privileges as a market town in 1358. From the 15th century, the city was governed by a 12-member council. Skien was historically a centre of seafaring, timber exports, and early industrialization. It was one of Norway's two or three largest cities between the 16th and 19th centuries. It was also one of Norway's most internationally oriented cities, with extensive contact with its export markets in the Low Countries, the United Kingdom, and Denmark. It retained its position as Eastern Norway's leading commercial city until the 19th century, when it gradually started to lose importance to the emerging capital of Christiania following the Napoleonic Wars. The city was the birthplace of playwright Henrik Ibsen, and many of his famous dramas are set in places reminiscent of early 19th-century Skien.

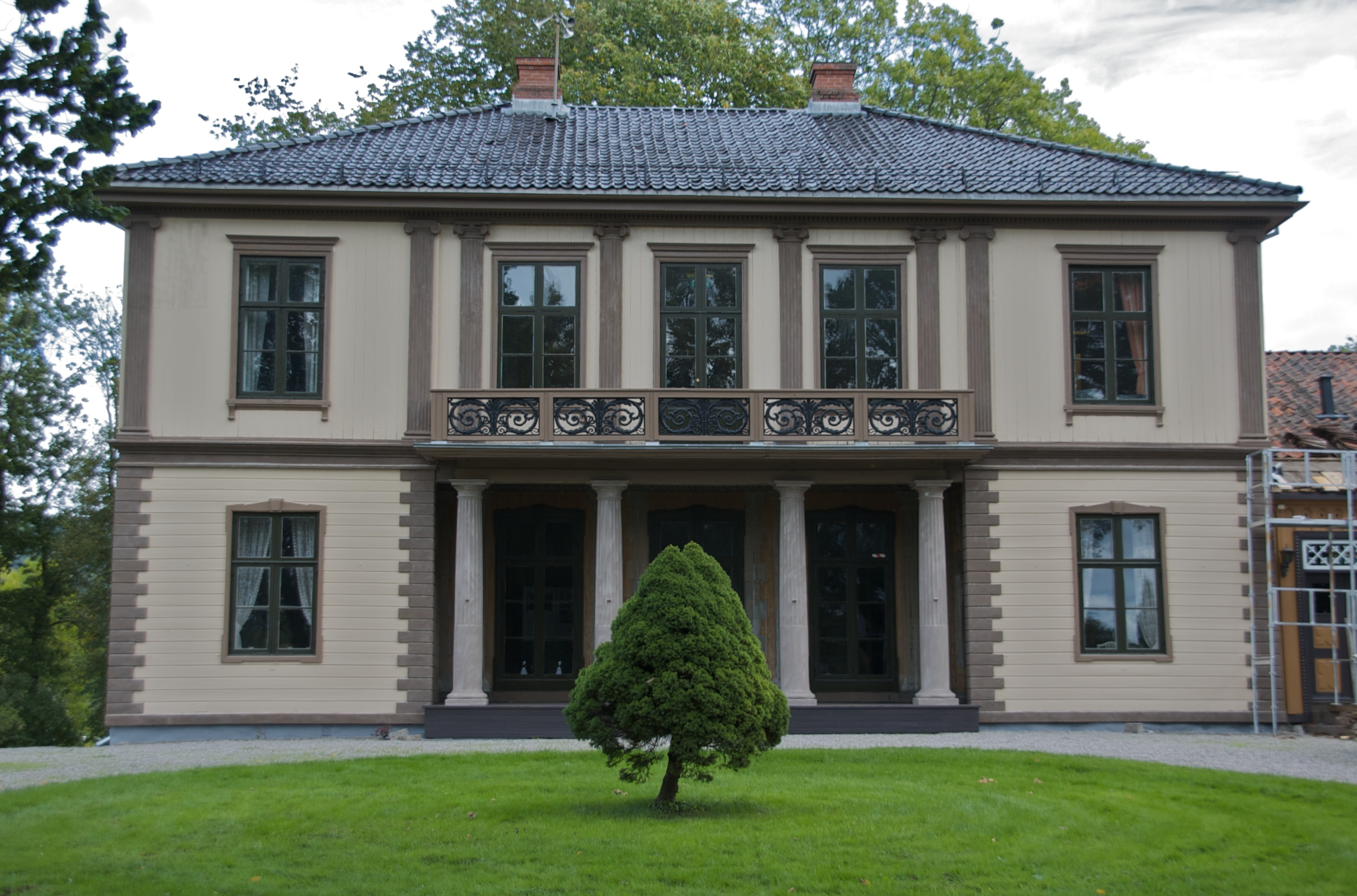
Frogner Manor in Skien

Until 1979, it was thought that Skien was founded in the 14th century. However, the archaeological discovery of a carving of the Skien animal has established that its founding preceded 1000 A.D. The city was then a meeting place for inland farmers and marine traders, and also a centre for trading whetstones from Eidsborg (inland Telemark). Gimsøy Abbey was founded in the 12th century. Skien was given formal commercial town rights by the Norwegian crown in 1358. Timber has historically been the principal export from Skien, and in the sixteenth century the city became the Kingdom's leading port for shipping timber. The oldest remaining building is Gjerpen church (built in approximately 1150).

From the 16th century, the city came to be dominated by a group of families known as patricians. In an 1882 letter to Georg Brandes, Henrik Ibsen mentions the families Paus, Plesner, von der Lippe, Cappelen, and Blom as the most prominent patrician families when he grew up there.

The formannskapsdistrikt law of 1837 created a system of local government in Norway by establishing each town or city (ladested or kjøpstad) and each Church of Norway prestegjeld as a civil municipality. On 1 January 1838, the kjøpstad of Skien was established as Skien Municipality.

On 1 January 1856, an area of Gjerpen Municipality (population: 1,286) was annexed by the growing town of Skien. Again, on 1 July 1916, another area of Gjerpen Municipality (population: 1,332) and an area of Solum Municipality (population: 1,042) was annexed by the growing town of Skien.

During the 1960s, there were many municipal mergers across Norway due to the work of the Schei Committee. On 1 January 1964, the following areas were merged to form an enlarged Skien Municipality:

- all of Skien Municipality (population: 15,805)
- all of Solum Municipality (population: 13,706)
- all of Gjerpen Municipality (population: 15,300)
- the Valebø area of Holla Municipality (population: 259)

A series of large fires have ravaged the town over the years: in 1652, 1671, 1681, 1732, 1766, 1777, and 1886. Most of these fires significantly damaged the city.

=== Frogner Manor in Skien ===
Frogner Manor (Frogner Hovedgård) is a manor house on the outskirts of Skien. The manor house was built for shipowner and timber merchant Christopher Hansen Blom (died 1879) and his wife Marie Elisabeth (Cappelen) Blom (died 1834). The main building is influenced by Italian Renaissance architecture. The garden was laid out in English landscape style in the 1850s.

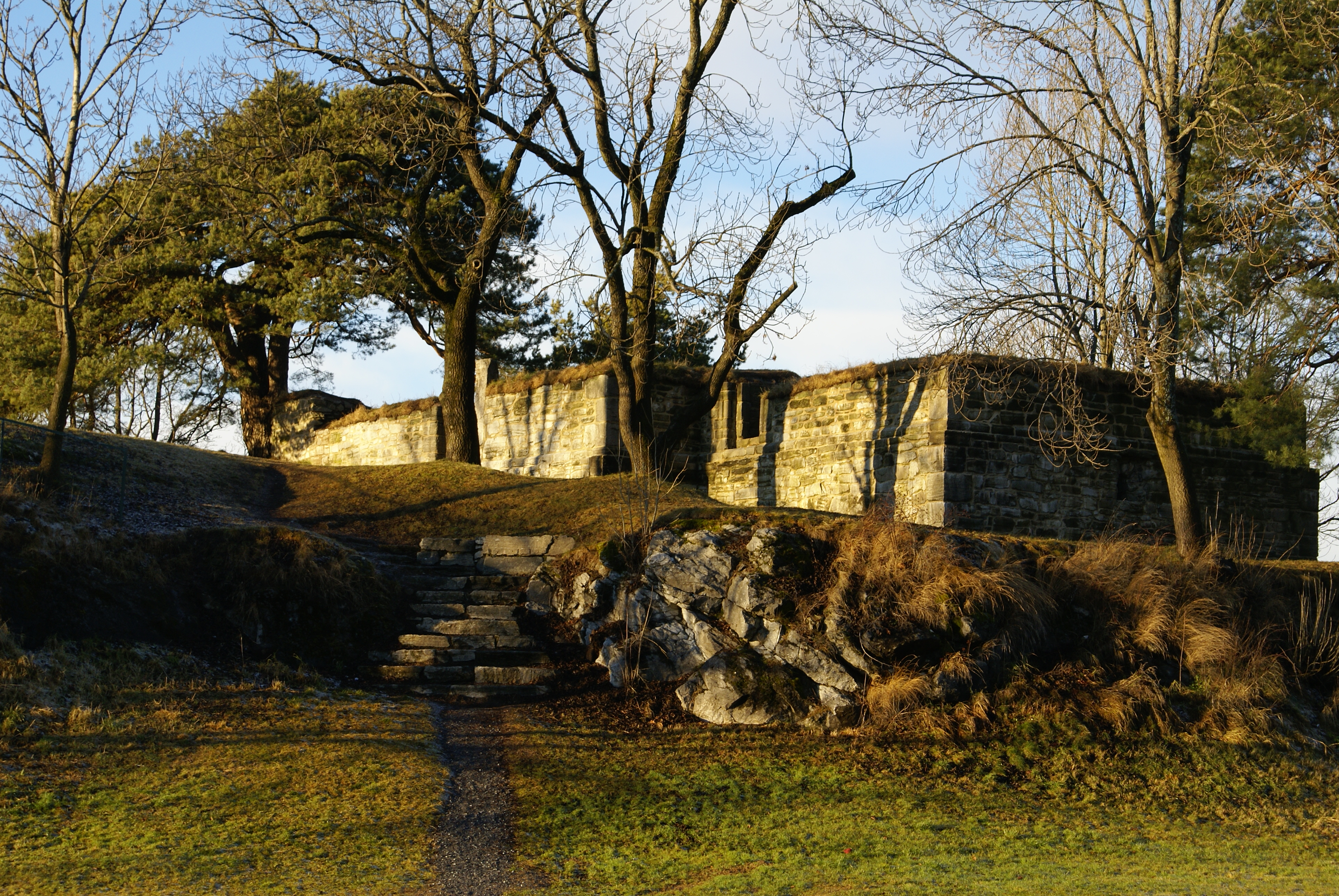
Kapitelberget church ruins

=== Kapitelberget ===
The Church on Kapitelberget (Kirken på Kapitelberget) was a medieval church. Kapitelberget was a private chapel on Bratsberg farm dating to the early 1100s. It is not known when the church went out of use, but Bratsberg farm burned down in 1156. in 1576, Peder Claussøn Friis reviewed it as a ruin. The site was first excavated in 1901. In 1928, Gerhard Fischer undertook restoration and preservation. The work was completed in 1933.

== Government ==
In Norway, municipalities are the unit of local government. This means that cities and towns are simply designations for urban areas, but under current Norwegian law, they have no actual government authority. The city of Skien lies within Skien Municipality and is therefore governed by the municipal council of Skien Municipality.

== Climate ==
Climate data for Gjerpen - Århus 1991–2020 (41 m, avg high/low 2013–2025)
Month	Jan	Feb	Mar	Apr	May	Jun	Jul	Aug	Sep	Oct	Nov	Dec	Year
Mean daily maximum °C (°F)	1.4 (34.5)	3.5 (38.3)	7 (45)	12.1 (53.8)	17.2 (63.0)	21.2 (70.2)	22.9 (73.2)	21.3 (70.3)	17.8 (64.0)	11.5 (52.7)	5.4 (41.7)	2 (36)	11.9 (53.6)
Daily mean °C (°F)	−2.6 (27.3)	−1.9 (28.6)	1.3 (34.3)	5.8 (42.4)	11.1 (52.0)	15.1 (59.2)	17.2 (63.0)	15.8 (60.4)	12.1 (53.8)	6.6 (43.9)	1.9 (35.4)	−2.0 (28.4)	6.7 (44.1)
Mean daily minimum °C (°F)	−5 (23)	−4.1 (24.6)	−2.4 (27.7)	0.8 (33.4)	5.9 (42.6)	10.1 (50.2)	11.9 (53.4)	10.6 (51.1)	8.3 (46.9)	3.7 (38.7)	−0.4 (31.3)	−4.3 (24.3)	2.9 (37.3)
Average precipitation mm (inches)	64.0 (2.52)	52.0 (2.05)	43.0 (1.69)	50.0 (1.97)	76.0 (2.99)	84.0 (3.31)	76.0 (2.99)	102.0 (4.02)	88.0 (3.46)	109.0 (4.29)	93.0 (3.66)	65.0 (2.56)	902.0 (35.51)
Source: yr.no (mean, precipitation)

== See also ==
- List of towns and cities in Norway
