= Norsjø =

Lake in Telemark, Norway

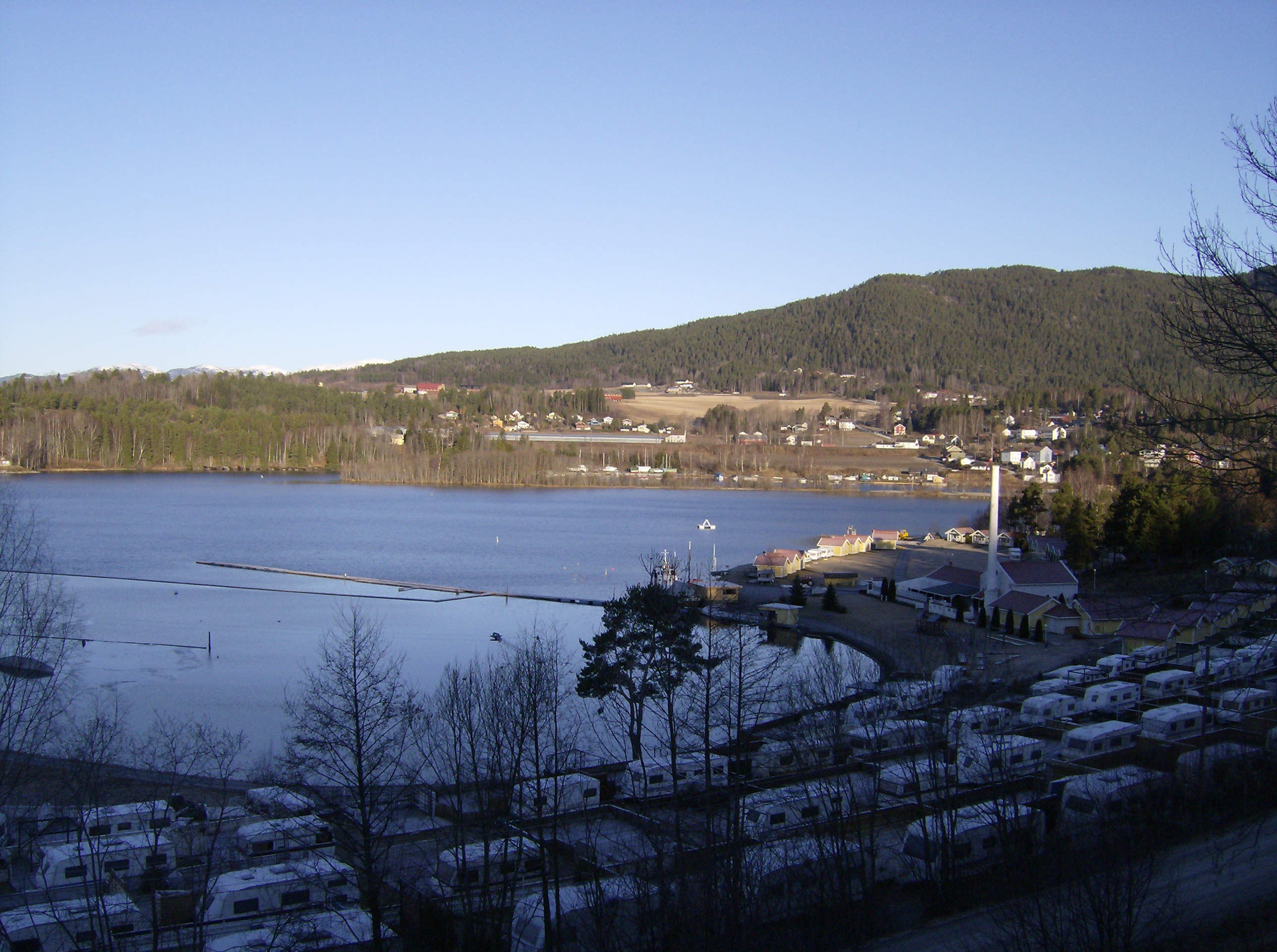
- View of Norsjo at Gvarv
- Interactive map of Norsjø
- Location: Midt-Telemark, Nome, and Skien, Telemark
- Coordinates: 59.22495°N 9.45912°E
- Type: glacial fjord lake
- Primary inflows: Bøelva, Eidselva, Gvarvelva and Sauarelva rivers
- Primary outflows: Farelva then Skien River
- Catchment area: 10,388.16 km^{2} (4,010.89 sq mi)
- Basin countries: Norway
- Max. length: 28 km (17 mi)
- Max. width: 5 km (3.1 mi)
- Surface area: 58.4 km^{2} (22.5 sq mi)
- Average depth: 87 m (285 ft)
- Max. depth: 176 m (577 ft)
- Water volume: 5.08 km^{3} (1.22 cu mi)
- Shore length^{1}: 123.35 km (76.65 mi)
- Surface elevation: 15 m (49 ft)
- References: NVE
- ^{1} Shore length is not a well-defined measure.

Norsjø is a lake in the municipalities of Skien, Nome, and Midt-Telemark in Telemark county, Norway. The 58-square-kilometre (22 sq mi) lake sits at an elevation of 15 m (49 ft) above sea level.

Norsjø is part of the Telemark Canal. Most rivers in Telemark flow into the lake Norsjø including the rivers Bøelva, Sauarelva, and Eidselva. The lake then drains through the Farelva river which flows into the Skien river. Norsjø is a source of drinking water for Skien Municipality.

== See also ==
- List of lakes of Norway
