= Sauherad Municipality =

Former municipality in Norway

Sauherad Municipality Sauherad kommune
- Former municipality
- Saude herred (historic name); Søfde herred (historic name)
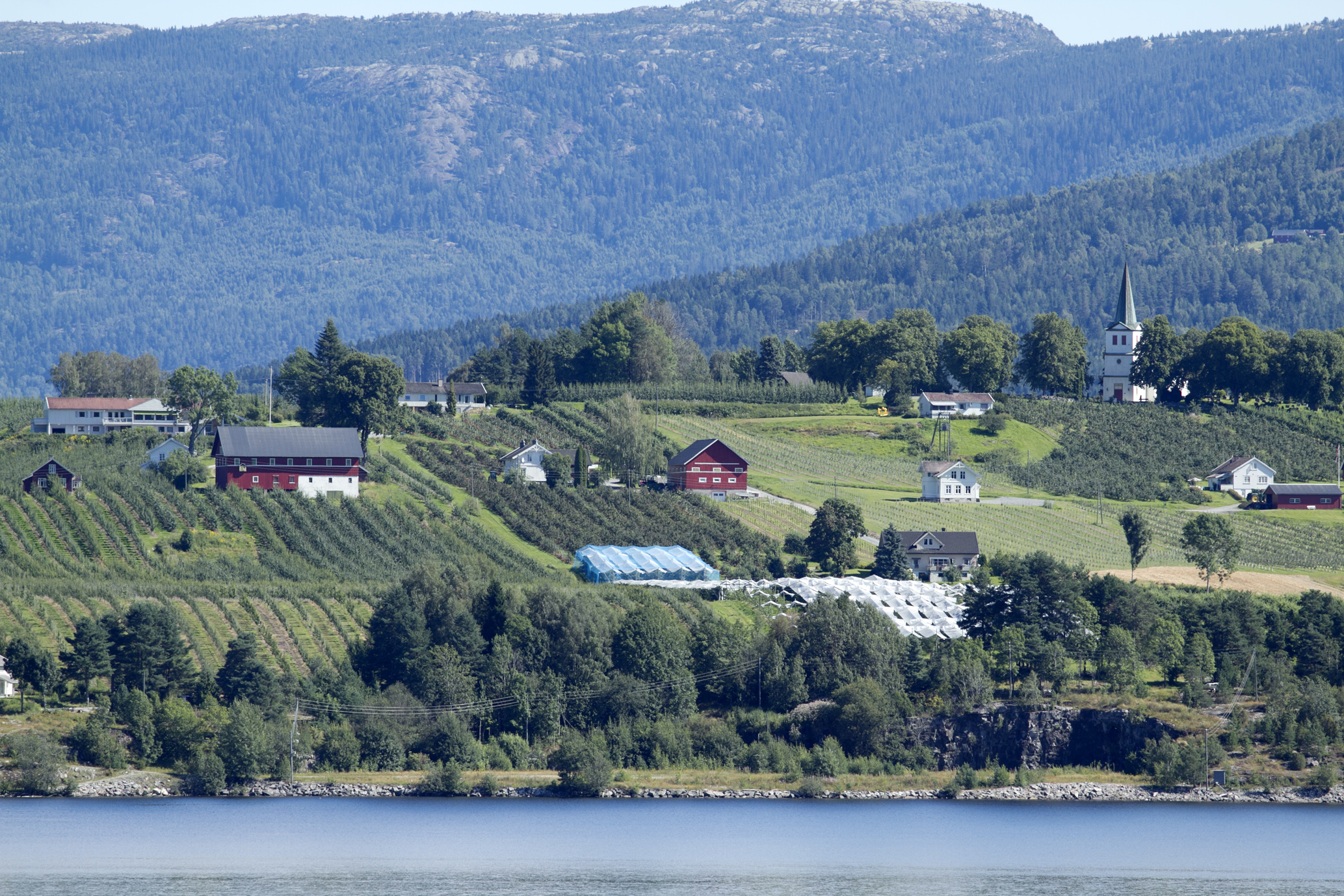
- View of Nesodden in Sauherad

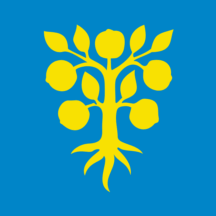
- Flag Coat of arms

- Telemark within Norway

- Sauherad within Telemark
- Coordinates: 59°26′0″N 9°15′55″E
- Country: Norway
- County: Telemark
- District: Midt-Telemark
- Established: 1 Jan 1838
  - Created as: Formannskapsdistrikt
- Disestablished: 1 Jan 2020
  - Succeeded by: Midt-Telemark Municipality
- Administrative centre: Akkerhaugen

Government
  - Mayor (2015–2019): Mette Haugholt (Ap)

Area (upon dissolution)
  - Total: 320.54 km^{2} (123.76 sq mi)
  - Land: 289.61 km^{2} (111.82 sq mi)
  - Water: 30.93 km^{2} (11.94 sq mi) 9.6%
  - Rank: #265 in Norway
- Highest elevation: 814.5 m (2,672 ft)

Population (2019)
  - Total: 4,293
  - Rank: #224 in Norway
  - Density: 14.8/km^{2} (38/sq mi)
  - Change (10 years): ▲ +0.4%
- Demonym: Sauhering

Official language
  - Norwegian form: Neutral
- Time zone: UTC+01:00 (CET)
  - Summer (DST): UTC+02:00 (CEST)
- ISO 3166 code: NO-0822

Sauherad is a former municipality in Telemark county, Norway. The 320.54-square-kilometre (123.76 sq mi) municipality existed from 1838 until its dissolution in 2020. The area is now divided between Midt-Telemark Municipality and Notodden Municipality in the traditional district of Midt-Telemark. The administrative centre was the village of Akkerhaugen. Other villages in the municipality included Gvarv, Holtsås, Hjukse, Hjuksebø, Nordagutu, and Sauherad.

Prior to its dissolution in 2020, the 320.54-square-kilometre (123.76 sq mi) municipality was the 265th largest by area out of the 422 municipalities in Norway. Sauherad Municipality was the 224th most populous municipality in Norway with a population of about 4,293. The municipality's population density was 14.8 inhabitants per square kilometre (38/sq mi) and its population had increased by 0.4% over the previous 10-year period.

== General information ==
=== Administrative history ===
The formannskapsdistrikt law of 1837 created a system of local government in Norway by establishing each town (ladested or kjøpstad) and each Church of Norway prestegjeld as a civil municipality. On 1 January 1838, Søfde prestegjeld was established as Søfde Municipality (later spelled Saude, then Sauherad). On 1 January 1903, an unpopulated area of Saude Municipality was transferred to the neighboring Gjerpen Municipality. On 1 July 1914 a small area of Sauherad Municipality (population: 27) was transferred to the neighboring Bø Municipality.

On 1 January 2020, Sauherad Municipality was dissolved and the following areas were merged to form the new Midt-Telemark Municipality:

- all of Bø Municipality (population: 6,630)
- most of Sauherad Municipality (population: 4,293), except for the Hjukse area which became part of Notodden Municipality

=== Name ===
The municipality is named after the old Sauherad prestegjeld. The prestegjeld was named after the old Sauar farm (Old Norse: Sauðar) since the first Sauherad Church was built there. The name comes from the plural form of sauðr which means "to boil" or "to seeth", likely referring to the current in the local river. The last element, herad (added in the 20th century) comes from the word herað which means "district" or "countryside". Thus it is "the district (herað) of Sauðar".

Historically, the name of the municipality was spelled Søfde. In 1862, the spelling was changed to Saude. On 3 November 1917, a royal resolution changed the spelling of the name of the municipality to Sauherad.

=== Coat of arms ===
The coat of arms was granted on 27 April 1989 and it was in use until 1 January 2020 when the municipality became part of the new Midt-Telemark Municipality. The official blazon is "Azure, an apple tree Or" (Norwegian: I blått et gull epletre). This means the arms have a blue field (background) and the charge is an apple tree with leaves and apples. The charge has a tincture of Or which means it is commonly colored yellow, but if it is made out of metal, then gold is used. The design was chosen since apple cultivation is a major industry in the municipality. The arms were designed by Halvor Holtskog. The municipal flag has the same design as the coat of arms.

=== Churches ===
The Church of Norway had one parish (sokn) within Sauherad Municipality. It was part of the Øvre Telemark prosti (deanery) in the Diocese of Agder og Telemark.

Churches in Sauherad Municipality
Parish (sokn)	Church name	Location of the church	Year built
Sauherad og Nes	Nes Church	Nesodden (just outside Gvarv)	c. 1180
Sauherad og Nes	Sauherad Church	Sauherad	c. 1150

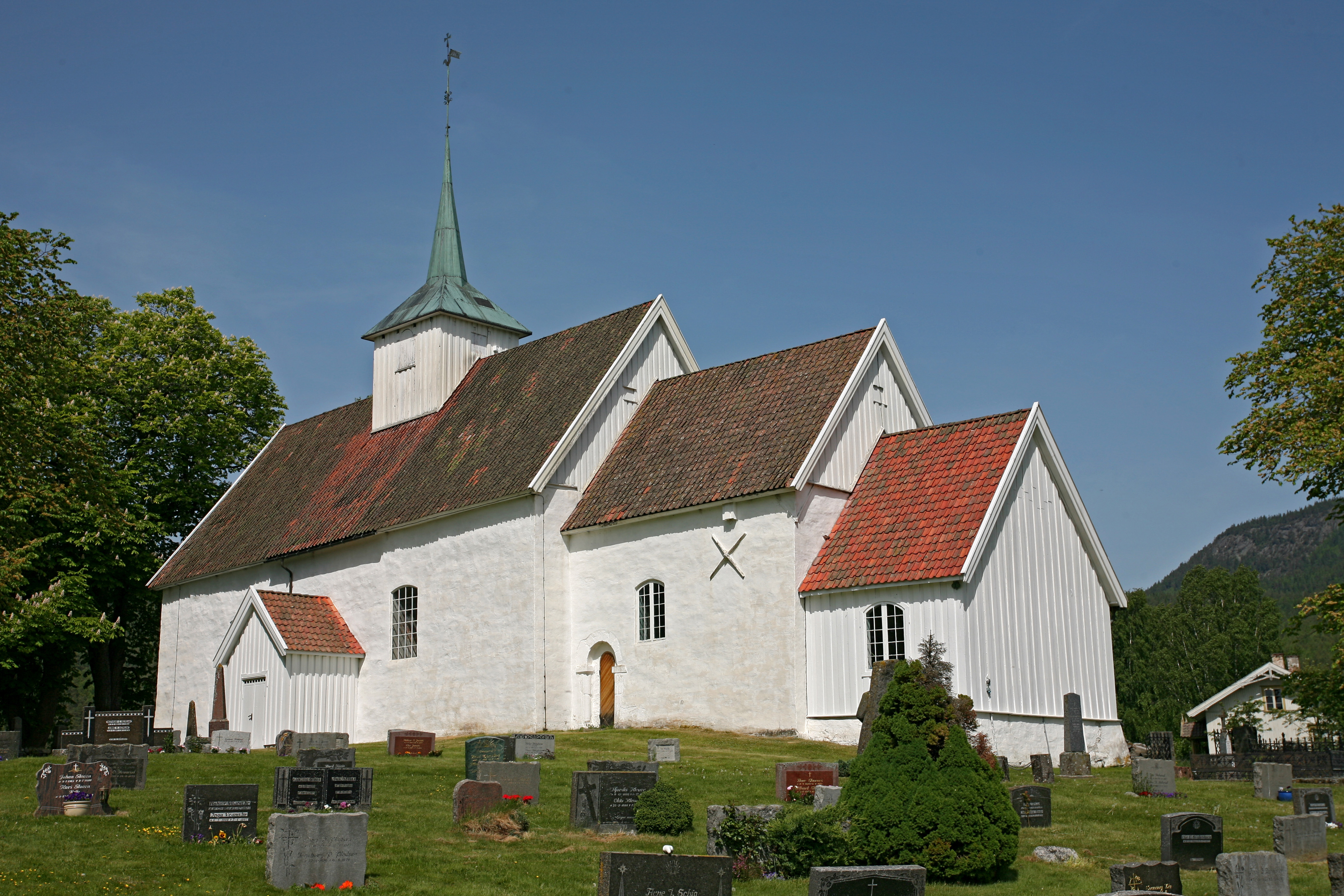
Sauherad Church

Sauherad Church dates from the medieval era. The church was built between 1150 and 1250. The edifice is of stone and has 260 seats. The church is built in Romanesque style. On the ridge, in the middle of the gable roof, sits a turret. The church bells are from 1441. The altarpiece from 1663 is of Renaissance style. In 1781 the building was extended westward. In 1830 the church received a new interior. The frescoes in the nave were uncovered and restore during the 1940s and 1950s.

== Geography ==
The highest point in the municipality was the 814.5-metre (2,672 ft) tall mountain Vardefjell. Notodden Municipality was located to the north, Kongsberg Municipality (in Buskerud county) was located to the northeast, Skien Municipality was located to the southeast, Nome Municipality was located to the southwest, and Bø Municipality was located to the west.

== Transportation ==
=== Railway ===
Both the Sørland Line and the Bratsberg Line ran through Sauherad. The Bratsberg Line runs as part of the Sørland Line between Hjuksebø and Nordagutu. The Hjukse Bridge at Hjuksebø on the Bratsberg Line is Norway's tallest railway bridge at 65 metres (213 ft). In 2019, Nordagutu Station was the only operating station left in Sauherad.

=== Roads ===
The Norwegian national roads 36 and 360 both went through Sauherad. Norwegian county roads 44, 151, 551, 553, and 555 also travelled through Sauherad. In 2008, all roads and streets got names, as one of the last municipalities in Norway to do this.

== Government ==
While it existed, Sauherad Municipality was responsible for primary education (through 10th grade), outpatient health services, senior citizen services, welfare and other social services, zoning, economic development, and municipal roads and utilities. The municipality was governed by a municipal council of directly elected representatives. The mayor was indirectly elected by a vote of the municipal council. The municipality was under the jurisdiction of the Aust-Telemark District Court and the Agder Court of Appeal.

=== Municipal council ===
The municipal council (Kommunestyre) of Sauherad Municipality was made up of 29 representatives that were elected to four year terms. The tables below show the historical composition of the council by political party.

Sauherad kommunestyre 2015–2019
Party name (in Norwegian)	Number of representatives
Labour Party (Arbeiderpartiet)	10
Progress Party (Fremskrittspartiet)	3
Green Party (Miljøpartiet De Grønne)	2
Conservative Party (Høyre)	3
Christian Democratic Party (Kristelig Folkeparti)	3
Centre Party (Senterpartiet)	6
Liberal Party (Venstre)	2
Total number of members:	29
Note: On 1 January 2020, Sauherad Municipality became part of Midt-Telemark Municipality.

Sauherad kommunestyre 2011–2015
Party name (in Norwegian)	Number of representatives
Labour Party (Arbeiderpartiet)	8
Progress Party (Fremskrittspartiet)	3
Conservative Party (Høyre)	4
Christian Democratic Party (Kristelig Folkeparti)	6
Centre Party (Senterpartiet)	5
Socialist Left Party (Sosialistisk Venstreparti)	1
Liberal Party (Venstre)	2
Total number of members:	29

Sauherad kommunestyre 2007–2011
Party name (in Norwegian)	Number of representatives
Labour Party (Arbeiderpartiet)	12
Progress Party (Fremskrittspartiet)	4
Conservative Party (Høyre)	3
Christian Democratic Party (Kristelig Folkeparti)	3
Centre Party (Senterpartiet)	4
Socialist Left Party (Sosialistisk Venstreparti)	2
Liberal Party (Venstre)	1
Total number of members:	29

Sauherad kommunestyre 2003–2007
Party name (in Norwegian)	Number of representatives
Labour Party (Arbeiderpartiet)	10
Progress Party (Fremskrittspartiet)	5
Conservative Party (Høyre)	2
Christian Democratic Party (Kristelig Folkeparti)	3
Centre Party (Senterpartiet)	5
Socialist Left Party (Sosialistisk Venstreparti)	3
Liberal Party (Venstre)	1
Total number of members:	29

Sauherad kommunestyre 1999–2003
Party name (in Norwegian)	Number of representatives
Labour Party (Arbeiderpartiet)	9
Progress Party (Fremskrittspartiet)	3
Conservative Party (Høyre)	3
Christian Democratic Party (Kristelig Folkeparti)	4
Centre Party (Senterpartiet)	6
Socialist Left Party (Sosialistisk Venstreparti)	3
Liberal Party (Venstre)	1
Total number of members:	29

Sauherad kommunestyre 1995–1999
Party name (in Norwegian)	Number of representatives
Labour Party (Arbeiderpartiet)	9
Progress Party (Fremskrittspartiet)	3
Conservative Party (Høyre)	3
Christian Democratic Party (Kristelig Folkeparti)	4
Centre Party (Senterpartiet)	6
Socialist Left Party (Sosialistisk Venstreparti)	3
Liberal Party (Venstre)	1
Total number of members:	29

Sauherad kommunestyre 1991–1995
Party name (in Norwegian)	Number of representatives
Labour Party (Arbeiderpartiet)	10
Conservative Party (Høyre)	4
Christian Democratic Party (Kristelig Folkeparti)	3
Centre Party (Senterpartiet)	7
Socialist Left Party (Sosialistisk Venstreparti)	4
Liberal Party (Venstre)	1
Total number of members:	29

Sauherad kommunestyre 1987–1991
Party name (in Norwegian)	Number of representatives
Labour Party (Arbeiderpartiet)	13
Conservative Party (Høyre)	4
Christian Democratic Party (Kristelig Folkeparti)	3
Centre Party (Senterpartiet)	5
Socialist Left Party (Sosialistisk Venstreparti)	2
Liberal Party (Venstre)	2
Total number of members:	29

Sauherad kommunestyre 1983–1987
Party name (in Norwegian)	Number of representatives
Labour Party (Arbeiderpartiet)	15
Conservative Party (Høyre)	3
Christian Democratic Party (Kristelig Folkeparti)	3
Centre Party (Senterpartiet)	5
Socialist Left Party (Sosialistisk Venstreparti)	1
Liberal Party (Venstre)	2
Total number of members:	29

Sauherad kommunestyre 1979–1983
Party name (in Norwegian)	Number of representatives
Labour Party (Arbeiderpartiet)	14
Conservative Party (Høyre)	5
Christian Democratic Party (Kristelig Folkeparti)	3
Centre Party (Senterpartiet)	5
Liberal Party (Venstre)	2
Total number of members:	29

Sauherad kommunestyre 1975–1979
Party name (in Norwegian)	Number of representatives
Labour Party (Arbeiderpartiet)	14
Conservative Party (Høyre)	2
Christian Democratic Party (Kristelig Folkeparti)	3
Centre Party (Senterpartiet)	6
Socialist Left Party (Sosialistisk Venstreparti)	1
Liberal Party (Venstre)	3
Total number of members:	29

Sauherad kommunestyre 1971–1975
Party name (in Norwegian)	Number of representatives
Labour Party (Arbeiderpartiet)	14
Conservative Party (Høyre)	2
Christian Democratic Party (Kristelig Folkeparti)	3
Centre Party (Senterpartiet)	5
Socialist People's Party (Sosialistisk Folkeparti)	2
Liberal Party (Venstre)	3
Total number of members:	29

Sauherad kommunestyre 1967–1971
Party name (in Norwegian)	Number of representatives
Labour Party (Arbeiderpartiet)	13
Conservative Party (Høyre)	2
Christian Democratic Party (Kristelig Folkeparti)	3
Centre Party (Senterpartiet)	6
Socialist People's Party (Sosialistisk Folkeparti)	2
Liberal Party (Venstre)	3
Total number of members:	29

Sauherad kommunestyre 1963–1967
Party name (in Norwegian)	Number of representatives
Labour Party (Arbeiderpartiet)	14
Conservative Party (Høyre)	2
Christian Democratic Party (Kristelig Folkeparti)	3
Centre Party (Senterpartiet)	6
Socialist People's Party (Sosialistisk Folkeparti)	2
Liberal Party (Venstre)	2
Total number of members:	29

Sauherad herredsstyre 1959–1963
Party name (in Norwegian)	Number of representatives
Labour Party (Arbeiderpartiet)	12
Conservative Party (Høyre)	2
Christian Democratic Party (Kristelig Folkeparti)	4
Centre Party (Senterpartiet)	6
Liberal Party (Venstre)	3
List of workers, fishermen, and small farmholders (Arbeidere, fiskere, småbrukere liste)	2
Total number of members:	29

Sauherad herredsstyre 1955–1959
Party name (in Norwegian)	Number of representatives
Labour Party (Arbeiderpartiet)	14
Conservative Party (Høyre)	1
Christian Democratic Party (Kristelig Folkeparti)	4
Farmers' Party (Bondepartiet)	7
Liberal Party (Venstre)	3
Total number of members:	29

Sauherad herredsstyre 1951–1955
Party name (in Norwegian)	Number of representatives
Labour Party (Arbeiderpartiet)	10
Conservative Party (Høyre)	2
Christian Democratic Party (Kristelig Folkeparti)	4
Farmers' Party (Bondepartiet)	5
Liberal Party (Venstre)	4
List of workers, fishermen, and small farmholders (Arbeidere, fiskere, småbrukere liste)	3
Total number of members:	28

Sauherad herredsstyre 1947–1951
Party name (in Norwegian)	Number of representatives
Labour Party (Arbeiderpartiet)	10
Communist Party (Kommunistiske Parti)	3
Christian Democratic Party (Kristelig Folkeparti)	3
Farmers' Party (Bondepartiet)	8
Liberal Party (Venstre)	4
Total number of members:	28

Sauherad herredsstyre 1945–1947
Party name (in Norwegian)	Number of representatives
Labour Party (Arbeiderpartiet)	12
Communist Party (Kommunistiske Parti)	4
Christian Democratic Party (Kristelig Folkeparti)	4
Farmers' Party (Bondepartiet)	3
Liberal Party (Venstre)	3
Joint List(s) of Non-Socialist Parties (Borgerlige Felleslister)	2
Total number of members:	28

Sauherad herredsstyre 1937–1940*
Party name (in Norwegian)	Number of representatives
Labour Party (Arbeiderpartiet)	12
Conservative Party (Høyre)	2
Farmers' Party (Bondepartiet)	5
Liberal Party (Venstre)	6
Local List(s) (Lokale lister)	3
Total number of members:	28
Note: Due to the German occupation of Norway during World War II, no elections were held for new municipal councils until after the war ended in 1945.

=== Mayors ===
The mayor (Norwegian: ordfører) of Sauherad Municipality was the political leader of the municipality and the chairperson of the municipal council. The following people have held this position:

- 1838–1839: Torjus Hanssen Sauer
- 1839–1840: Magnus Andreas Gjør
- 1840–1841: Johannes Halvorsen Evje
- 1842–1843: Guttorm Torsteinsen Lindheim
- 1844–1846: Torjus Hanssen Sauer
- 1847–1852: Olav Nilssen Tveten
- 1853–1854: Thomas Thomassen Lunde
- 1854–1860: Edvard Sørensen
- 1861–1866: Halvor Bjørnsen Holte
- 1867–1867: Anders Halvorsen Fure
- 1868–1869: Anders Olsen Jønsi
- 1870–1872: Halvor Bjørnsen Holte
- 1873–1879: Olav Halvorsen Gaathaug
- 1880–1881: Rollef Mathiassen Sunde
- 1882–1883: Torbjørn Hanssen Gurstad
- 1884–1893: Halvor Jonsen Holtan
- 1894–1898: Johannes Halvorsen Jonsaas
- 1898–1901: Hans H. Gripenstad
- 1902–1906: Jon Sigurdsen Jonsaas (2 terms, død 1906)
- 1906–1907: Torjus Mathiassen Sølverud
- 1908–1911: Thorstein Gundheim
- 1912–1913: Halvor Andreassen Jønsi
- 1914–1916: Hans H. Gripenstad
- 1917–1925: Jon Johannessen Jonsaas
- 1925–1928: Hans Steinarsen Sauar (Bp)
- 1928–1934: Tollev Tollevsen Notevarp
- 1934–1937: Ole M. Gokstad (Ap)
- 1937–1941: Anund Kittelsen Kleivrud (Bp)
- 1941–1943: I.J. Storkås (NS)
- 1943–1945: Olav Kaljord (NS)
- 1945–1945: E. Jonsås (NS)
- 1945–1945: Anund Kittelsen Kleivrud (Bp)
- 1946–1947: Olav Stordalen (Ap)
- 1948–1955: Olav Halvorsen Sunde (KrF)
- 1955–1957: Kittel E. Bergan (Bp)
- 1957–1959: Petter Kolberg (Bp)
- 1959–1971: Asbjørn Hansen Wendelborg (Ap)
- 1971–1979: Hans O. Stenstad (Ap)
- 1979–1983: Olav Tinesmork (Sp)
- 1983–1991: Olav Stavdal (Ap)
- 1991–1999: Kristoffer Hesthag (Sp)
- 1999–2015: Hans Sundsvalen (Ap)
- 2015–2019: Mette Haugholt (Ap)

== Attractions ==
=== Events ===
- Sauheraddagane (since 1993)
- Kartfestivalen (Kart Festival, since 2005)
- Norsk Eplefest (Norwegian apple festival, since 2006)

=== Buildings ===
- Blæksås fortress (3-5th century)
- Bratningsborg fortress (3-5th century)
- Steinborg fortress (3-5th century)
- Evju Bygdetun (Museum)
- Nes stone church (12th century)
- Sauherad stone church (12th century)

== Notable people ==
- Enevold Steenblock Høyum (1775–1830), a military officer who was a representative at the Norwegian Constitutional Assembly
- Targjei Augundsson (1801 – 1872) known as Myllarguten (meaning the Millerboy), a fiddle player
- Hans Aimar Mow Grønvold (1846–1926), a Norwegian civil servant and music writer
- Lars Fykerud (1860–1902), a Norwegian Hardanger fiddler and composer
- Sverre Granlund DCM (1918–1943), a Norwegian commando during WWII
- Arne Haukvik (1926–2002), a politician and founder of the Bislett Games
- Liv Holtskog (1934 in Gvarv - 2014), a Norwegian fruit farmer and poet
- Johannes Akkerhaugen (born 1939), an archer who competed at the 1972 Summer Olympics

== Sister cities ==
Sauherad had sister city agreements with the following places:

- Karlsborg, Västra Götaland County, Sweden

== See also ==
- List of former municipalities of Norway
