= Sauherad =

Sauherad may refer to:

== Places ==
- Sauherad (village), a village in Midt-Telemark Municipality in Telemark county, Norway
- Sauherad Municipality, a former municipality in Telemark county, Norway
- Sauherad Church, a church in Midt-Telemark Municipality in Telemark county, Norway
- Sauherad prestegjeld, a former geographic subdivision of the Church of Norway in Telemark county, Norway
