= Hjuksebø =

Village in Notodden Municipality, Norway

- Village
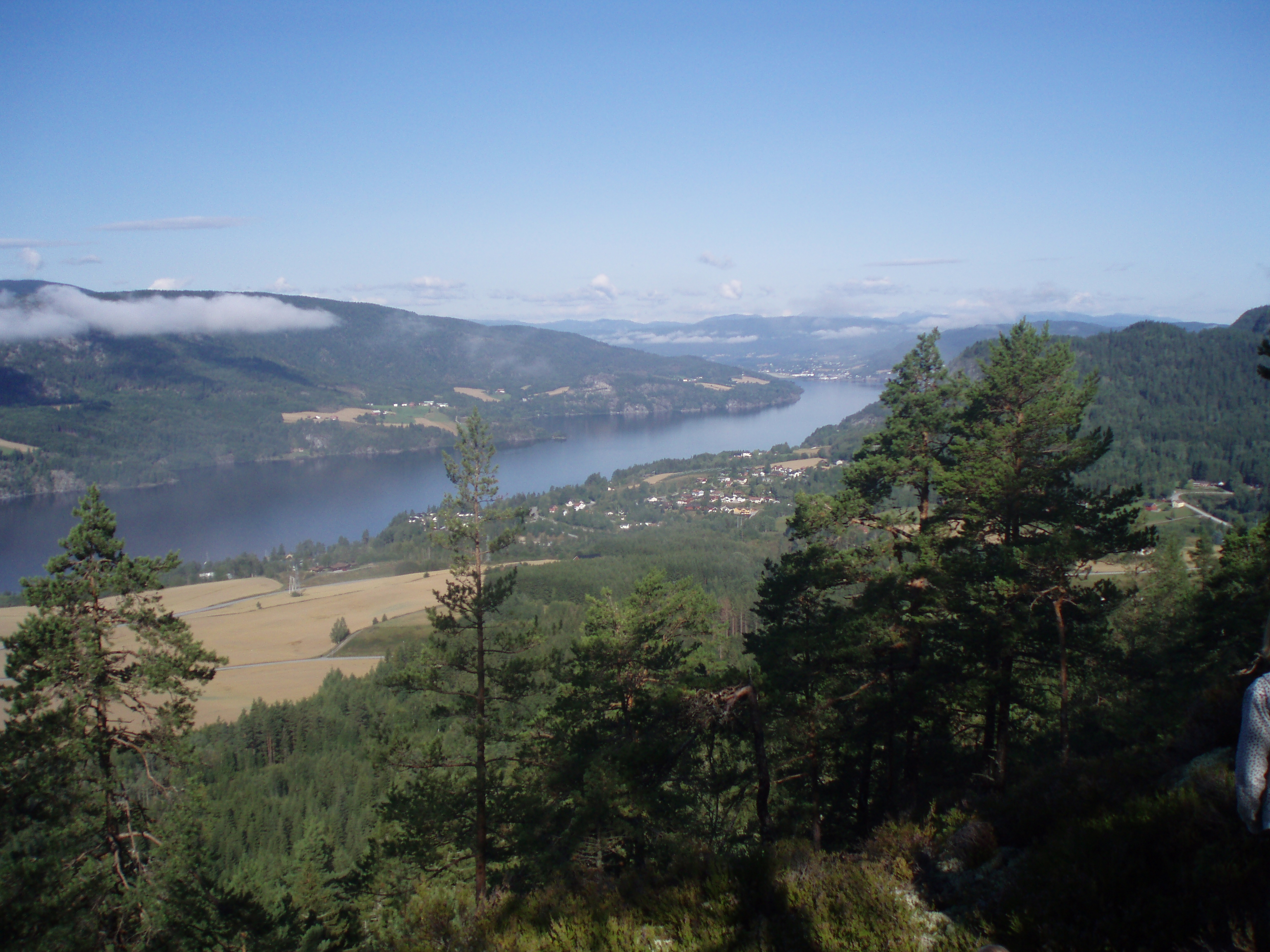
- View of the village, looking towards Notodden
- Interactive map of Hjuksebø
- Coordinates: 59.49227°N 9.33385°E
- Country: Norway
- Region: Eastern Norway
- County: Telemark
- District: Aust-Telemark
- Municipality: Notodden Municipality
- Elevation: 156 m (512 ft)
- Time zone: UTC+01:00 (CET)
  - Summer (DST): UTC+02:00 (CEST)
- Post Code: 3683 Notodden

Hjuksebø is a village in Notodden Municipality in Telemark county, Norway. The village is located just south of Hjuksevelta, roughly half-way between the town of Notodden and the village of Nordagutu (in Midt-Telemark Municipality. This village is located on the hills overlooking the eastern shore of the lake Heddalsvatnet.

== History ==
Hjuksebø Station is a former train station in this village. The station was located along the Bratsberg Line. The Hjuksebø train disaster occurred between the Hjuksebø and Holtsås stations on 15 November 1950, and was Norway's worst railway accident in peacetime until the Tretten train disaster in 1975.

On 1 January 2020, the Hjuksebø area was transferred from Sauherad Municipality into the neighboring Notodden Municipality.
