= Sagavoll Folk High School =

Coordinates: 59.3888°N 9.1643°E

Sagavoll Folkehøgskole
- Gvarv, Telemark; Norway

Information
- Type: Private
- Motto: Tid for liv
- Established: 1893
- Head teacher: Kjersti Versto Roheim
- Enrollment: 130
- Campus: Rural
- Religious orientation: Christianity
- Website: hwww.sagavoll.no

Sagavoll folkehøgskole (English: Sagavoll Folk High School) is a Christian folk high school in Norway. It is situated in Gvarv, a village in Midt-Telemark Municipality in Telemark county. The school was founded in 1893 in Notodden by Asbjørn Knutsen, but later moved to its current location in Gvarv. It is an independent foundation, and is run by a board consisting of representatives from KRIK, Normisjon, and KFUK-KFUM (the Norwegian YMCA/YWCA).

== Subjects ==
Sagavoll offers one-year courses in nine different classes including:

- Dance
- The Outdoors, Bible, and Initiative
- The Outdoors
- Outdoor Activity Extreme
- Intercultural Focus
- KRIK: Sport and Bible
- KRIK: Volleyball and Skiing
- Music
- Textile, Clothes, and Interior design

In addition to these subjects, students can also choose from around 100 different modules, which are subjects the students can choose from outside what would be their typical class-related subjects.

== Boarding ==
The school has boarding for 130 students. They live in the various boarding houses on campus where they have either one-person or two-person rooms. The houses are two-story buildings (with the exception of Tunheim having only one, and Sagaheim having three), each floor housing either only males or only females. Occupants of a floor share a livingroom, showers and lavatory facilities.

=== The Houses ===
- Tunheim (one-story)
- Granheim
- Furuheim
- Bjørkheim
- Sagaheim (Three-story)
