= Haukvik =

Haukvik is a Norwegian surname. Notable people with the surname include:

- Arne Haukvik (1926–2002), Norwegian sports official and politician
- Olav Haukvik (1928–1992), Norwegian politician
