= Nes Church (Telemark) =

Church in Telemark, Norway

- Nes kyrkje
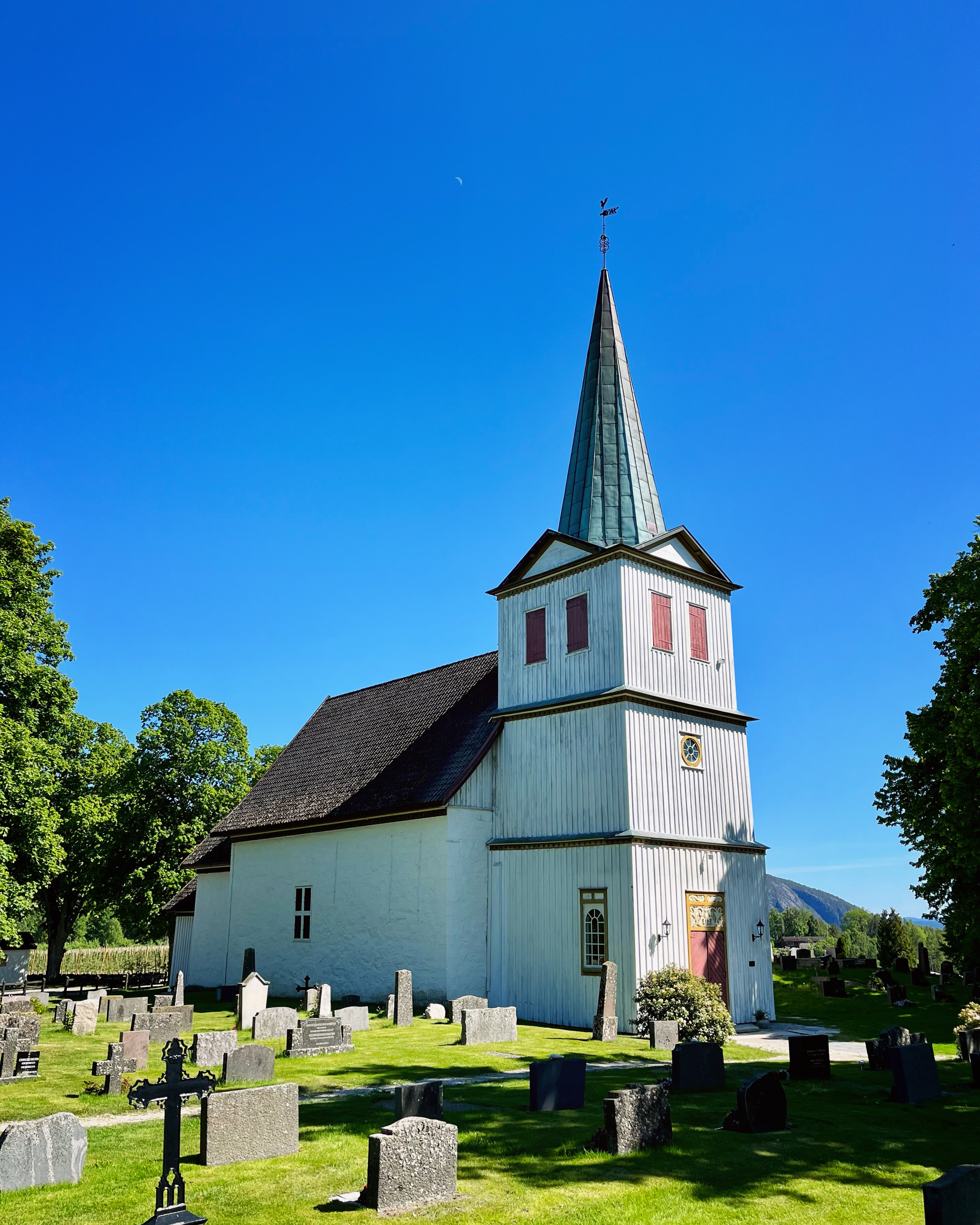
- View of the church
- Nes Church
- 59°22′19″N 9°13′19″E
- Location: Midt-Telemark Municipality, Telemark
- Country: Norway
- Denomination: Church of Norway
- Previous denomination: Catholic Church
- Churchmanship: Evangelical Lutheran

History
- Status: Parish church
- Founded: 12th century
- Consecrated: 13 September (year unknown)

Architecture
- Functional status: Active
- Architectural type: Long church
- Completed: 1180 (846 years ago)

Specifications
- Materials: Stone

Administration
- Diocese: Agder og Telemark
- Deanery: Øvre Telemark prosti
- Parish: Sauherad og Nes
- Norwegian Cultural Heritage Site
- Type: Church
- Status: Automatically protected
- ID: 85106

Nes Church (Norwegian: Nes kyrkje) is a parish church of the Church of Norway in Midt-Telemark Municipality in Telemark county, Norway. It is located at Nesodden, just to the southeast of the village of Gvarv. It is one of the churches for the Nes og Sauherad parish which is part of the Øvre Telemark prosti (deanery) in the Diocese of Agder og Telemark. The white, stone church was built in a long church design around 1180 using plans drawn up by an unknown architect. The church seats about 170 people.

== History ==
The earliest existing historical records of the church date back to the year 1398, but the church was built long before that time. The church at Nes was first built around the year 1180, but at that time it consisted of simply the chancel. Dendrochronological dating of the roof rafters confirm that the wood was cut around 1180. The nave was constructed in the years following the completion of the chancel since there are significant stylistic differences in the construction of the two parts of the building. The church was consecrated on 13 September, but it is unknown in what year. The building was dedicated to the apostles Peter and Paul. The church is thought to have been the main church for Sauherad until the Black Death. After the Reformation, it became an annex chapel to the main Sauherad Church. The church was without a tower for several hundred years. In 1634, the church records refer to the construction of a small tower on top of the roof and later in 1663, the records indicate there were two clocks on the tower. In 1868, the current west tower was built out of wood and the small roof tower was removed. The new tower was large enough to include a church porch underneath it. The same year a wooden sacristy was added on to the east of the choir.

== Media gallery ==
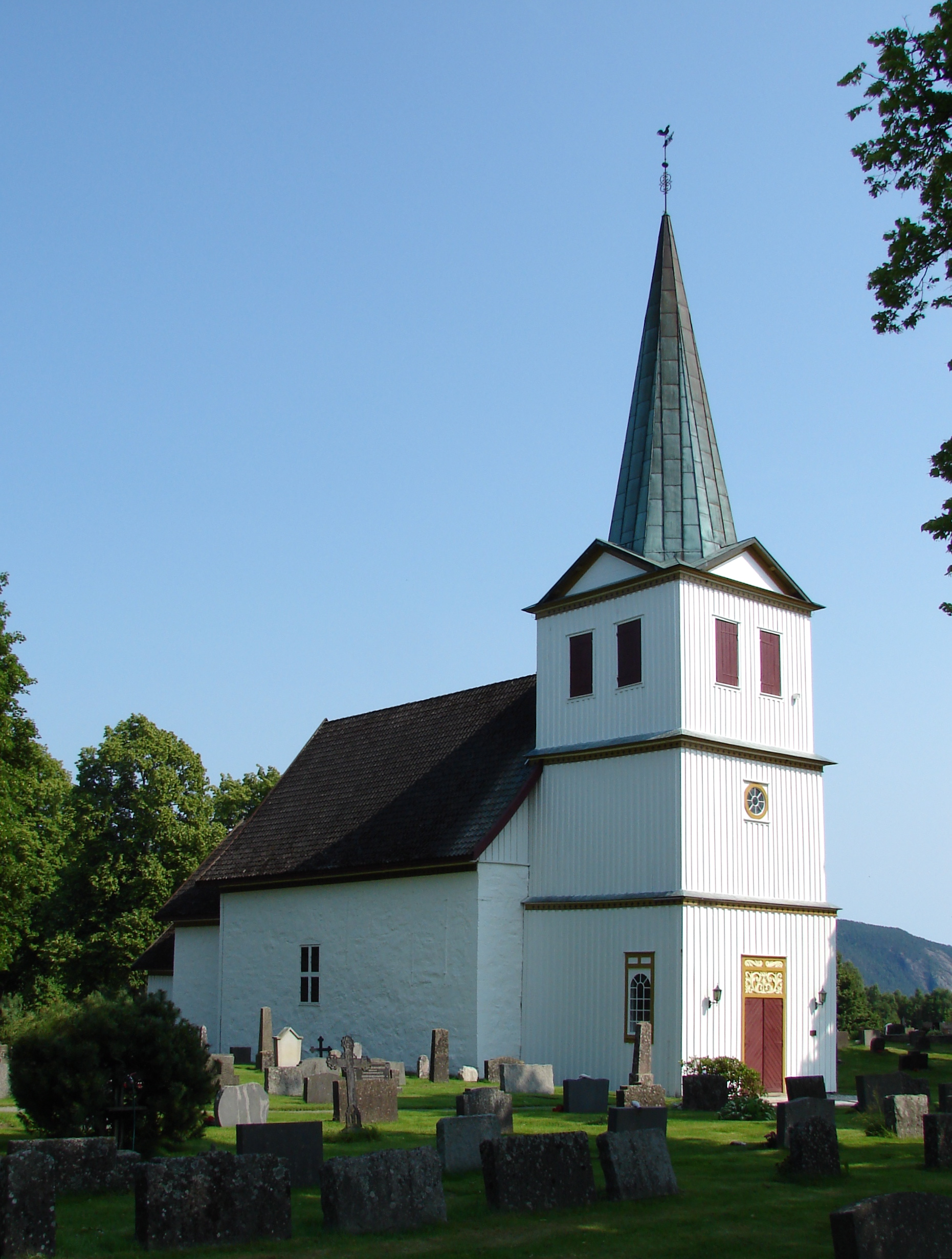

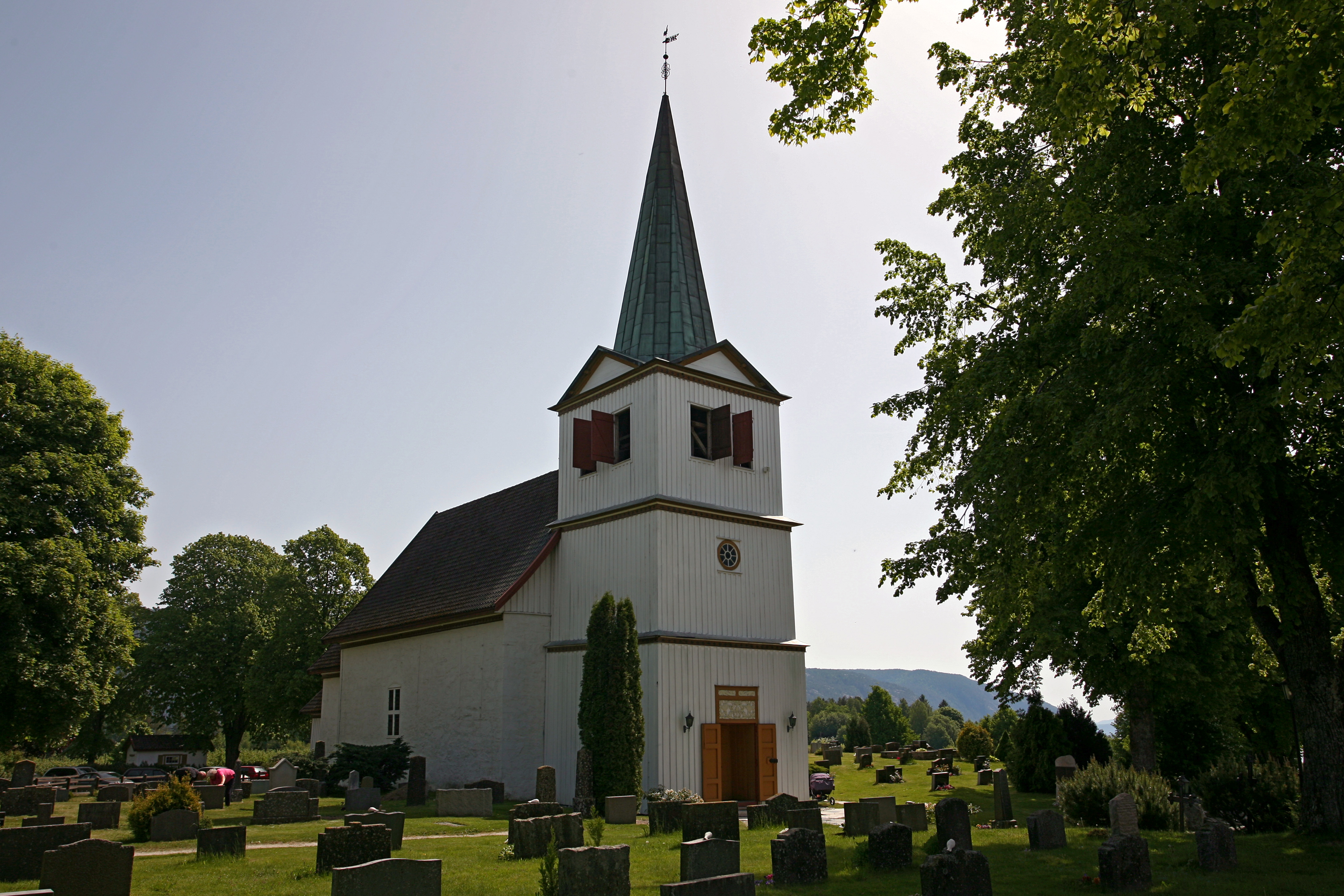

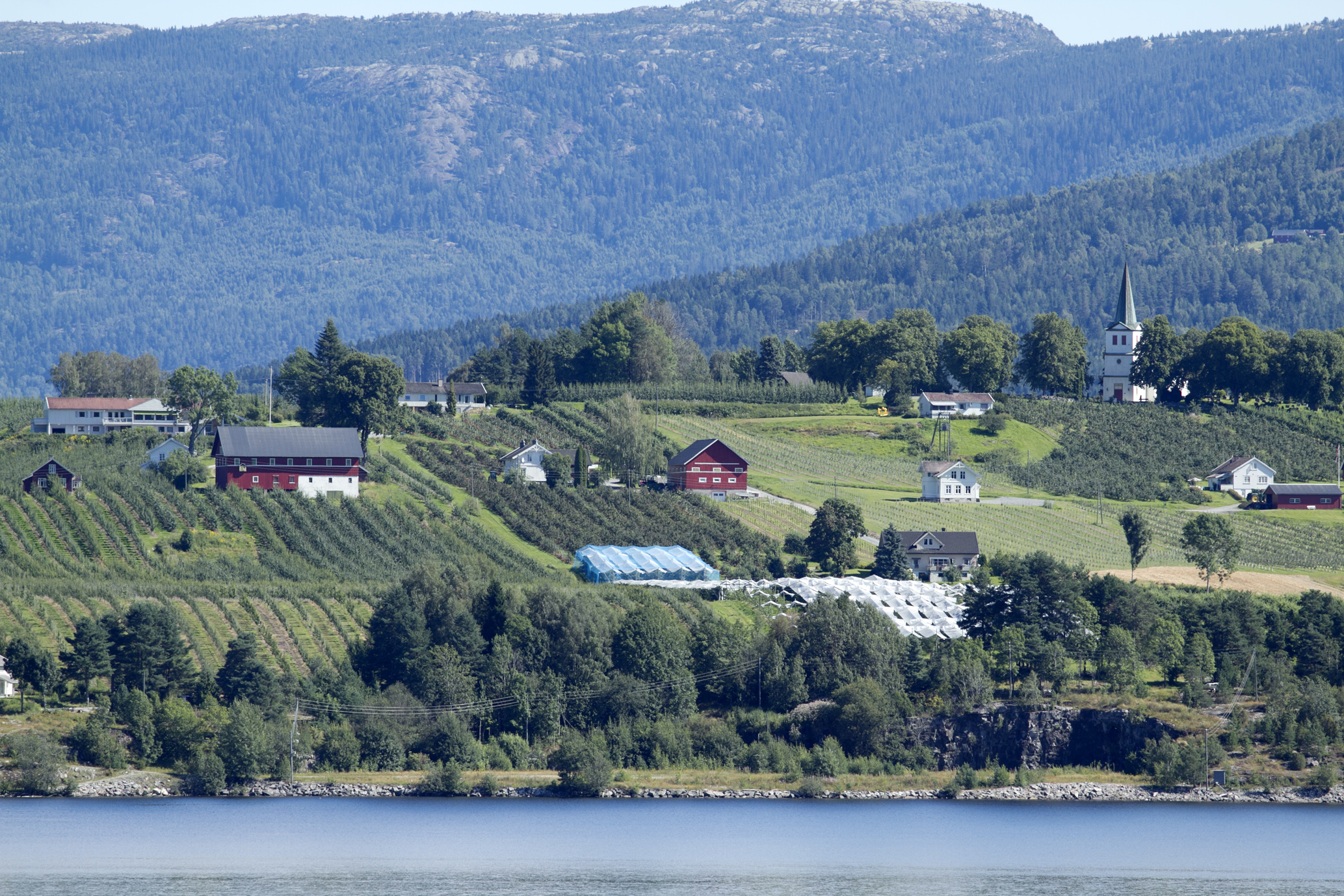

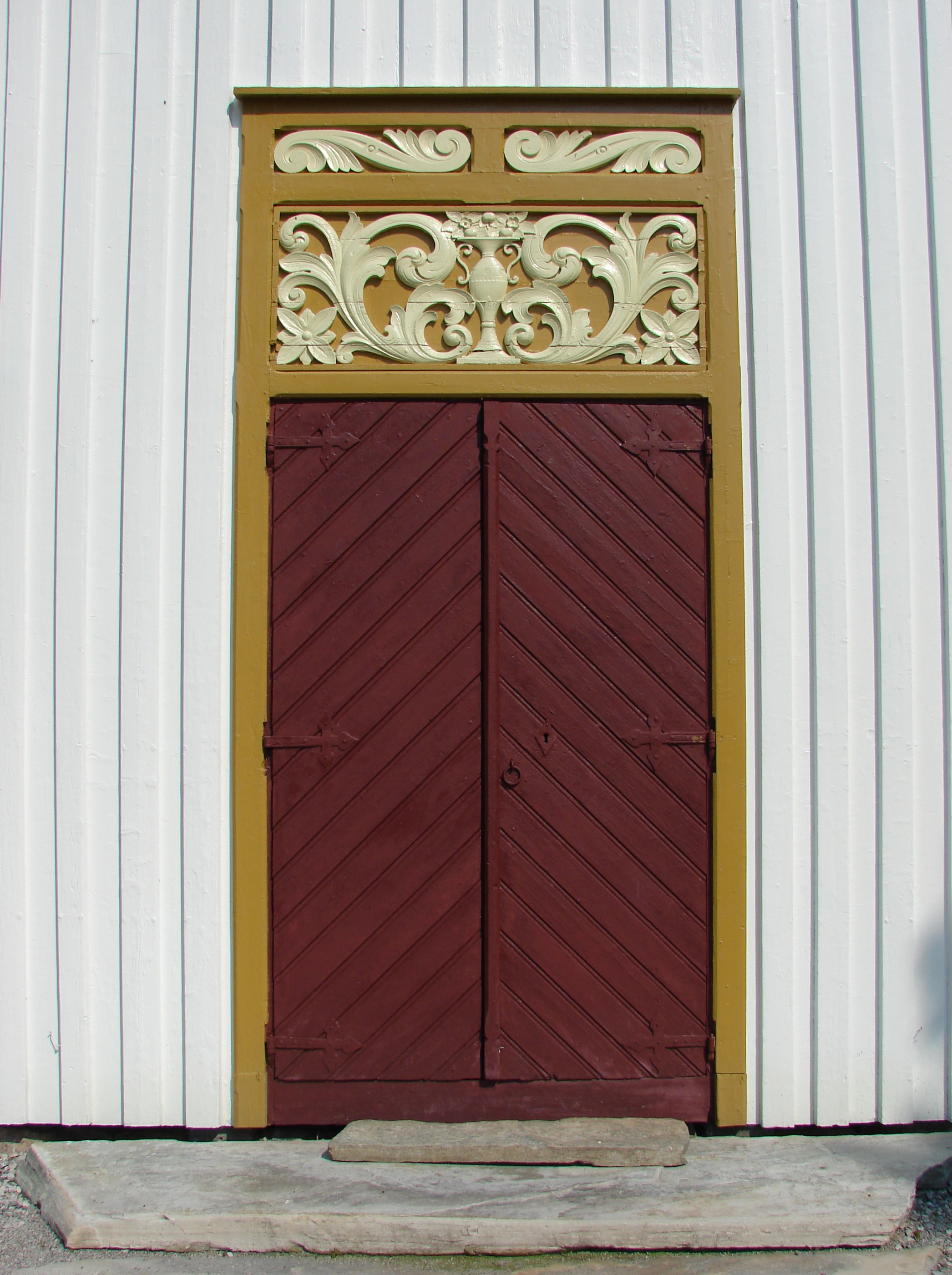

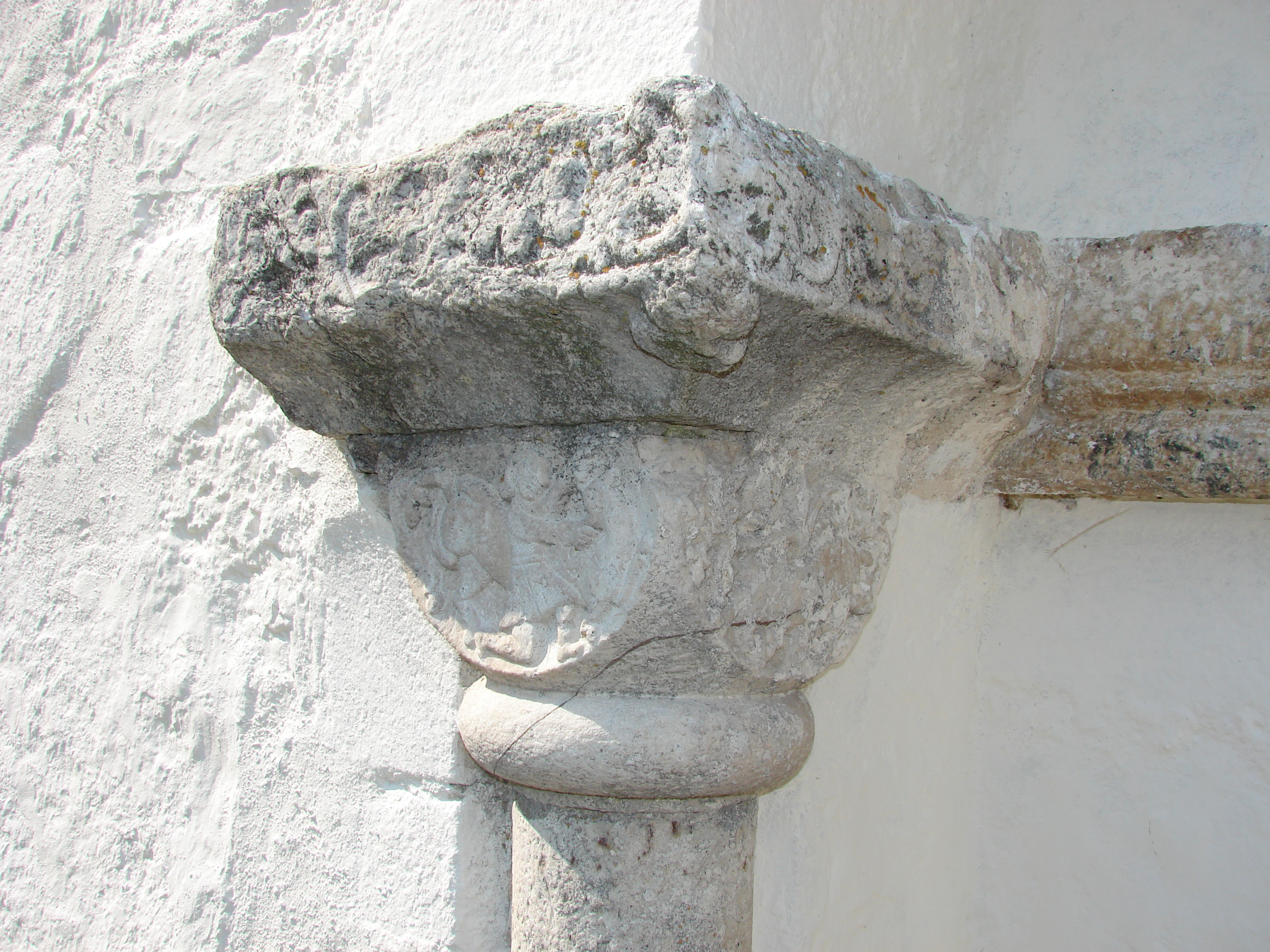

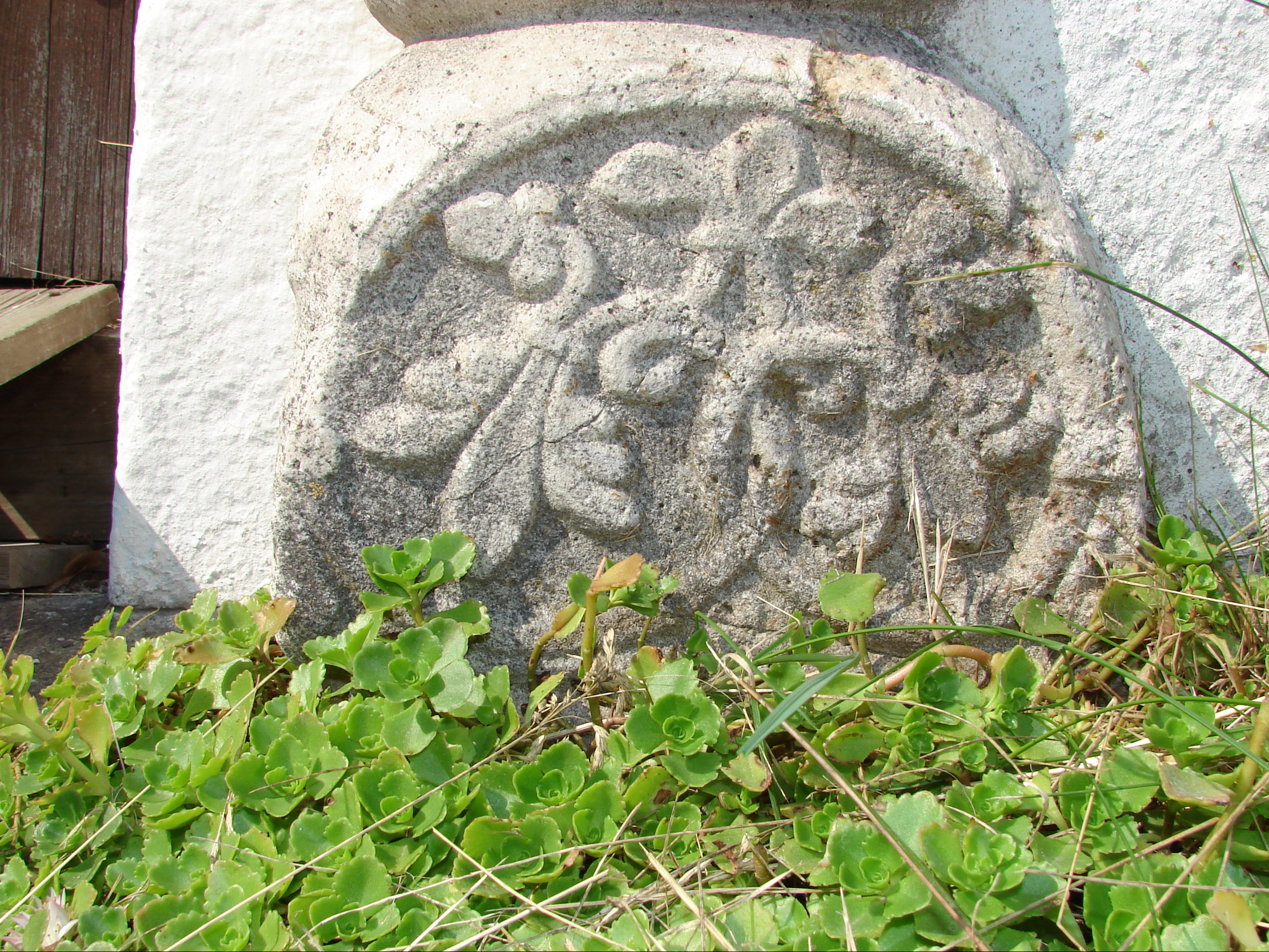

== See also ==
- List of churches in Agder og Telemark
