= Hjuksevelta =

Village in Notodden Municipality, Norway

Hjuksevelta Hjukse
- Village
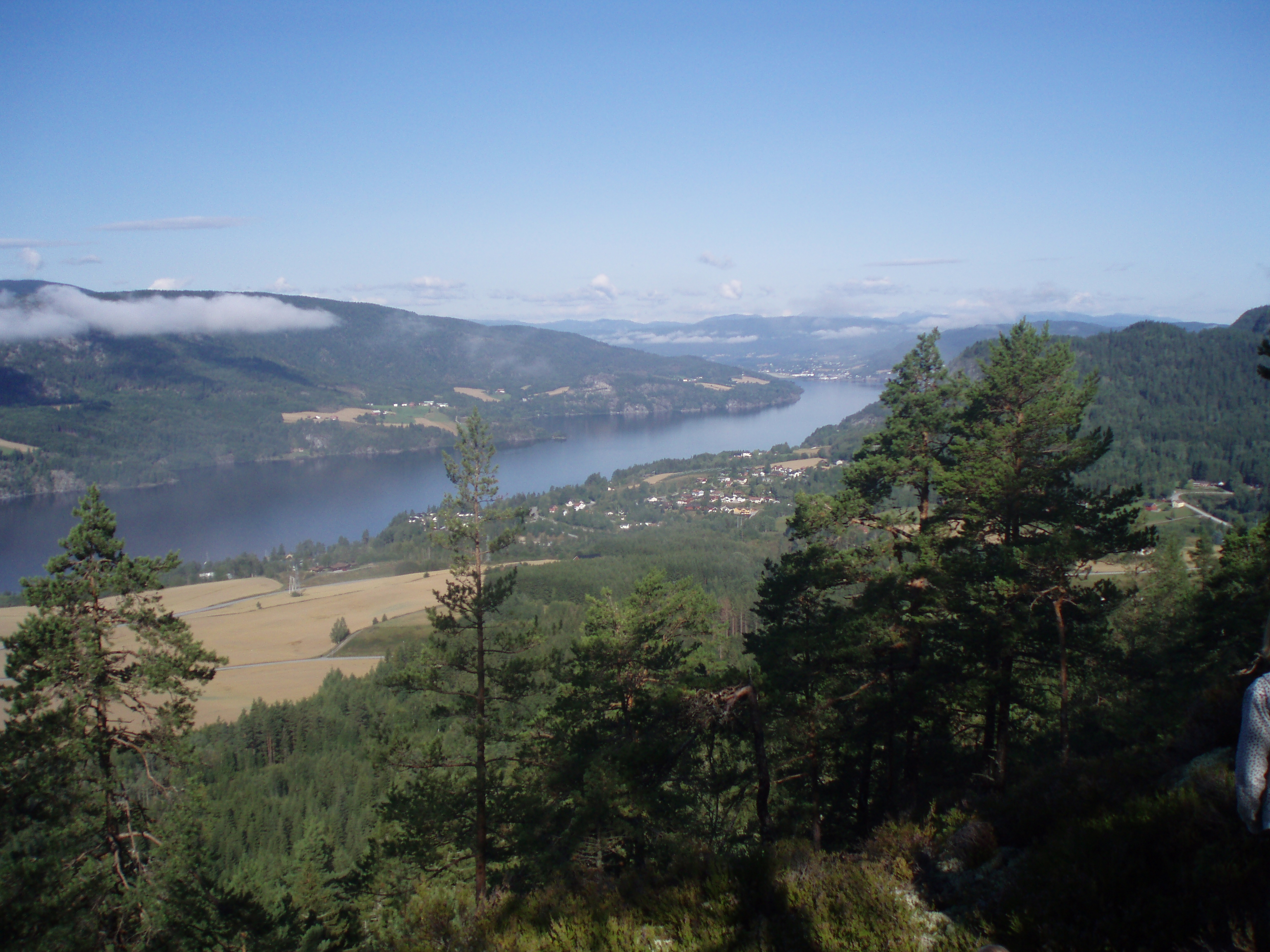
- View of the village area, looking towards Notodden
- Interactive map of Hjuksevelta
- Coordinates: 59.50875°N 9.3209°E
- Country: Norway
- Region: Eastern Norway
- County: Vestfold og Telemark
- District: Aust-Telemark
- Municipality: Notodden Municipality

Area
  - Total: 0.38 km^{2} (0.15 sq mi)
- Elevation: 25 m (82 ft)

Population (2025)
  - Total: 288
  - Density: 758/km^{2} (1,960/sq mi)
- Time zone: UTC+01:00 (CET)
  - Summer (DST): UTC+02:00 (CEST)
- Post Code: 3683 Notodden

Hjuksevelta or simply Hjukse is a village in Notodden Municipality in Telemark county, Norway. The village is located about half-way between the town of Notodden and the village of Nordagutu (in Midt-Telemark Municipality. The village is located on the hills overlooking the eastern shore of the lake Heddalsvatnet. The village of Hjuksebø and the old Hjuksebø Station are located just south of this village.

The 0.38-square-kilometre (94-acre) village has a population (2025) of 288 and a population density of 758 inhabitants per square kilometre (1,960/sq mi).

== History ==
On 1 January 2020, the Hjuksebø area was transferred from Sauherad Municipality to the neighboring Notodden Municipality.
