= Enevold =

Enevold is a given name. Notable people with the given name include:

- Enevold Brandt (1738–1772), Danish courtier
- Enevold De Falsen (1755–1808), Danish-Norwegian lawyer, poet, actor and statesman
- Enevold Steenblock Høyum (1775–1830), Norwegian military officer and politician
- Enevold Kruse (1554–1621), Danish nobleman
- Enevold Sørensen (1850–1920), Danish editor and politician
- Enevold Thømt (1878–1958), Norwegian painter
