= Johannes Akkerhaugen =

Norwegian archer (born 1939)

Personal information
- Nationality: Norwegian
- Born: 11 August 1939 (age 87) Sauherad Municipality, Norway

Sport
- Sport: Archery

Johannes Akkerhaugen (born 11 August 1939) is a Norwegian archer. He was born in Sauherad Municipality. He competed in archery at the 1972 Summer Olympics in Munich.
