= Holtsås =

Village in Midt-Telemark Municipality, Norway

Holtsås Holtsaas (historic)
- Village
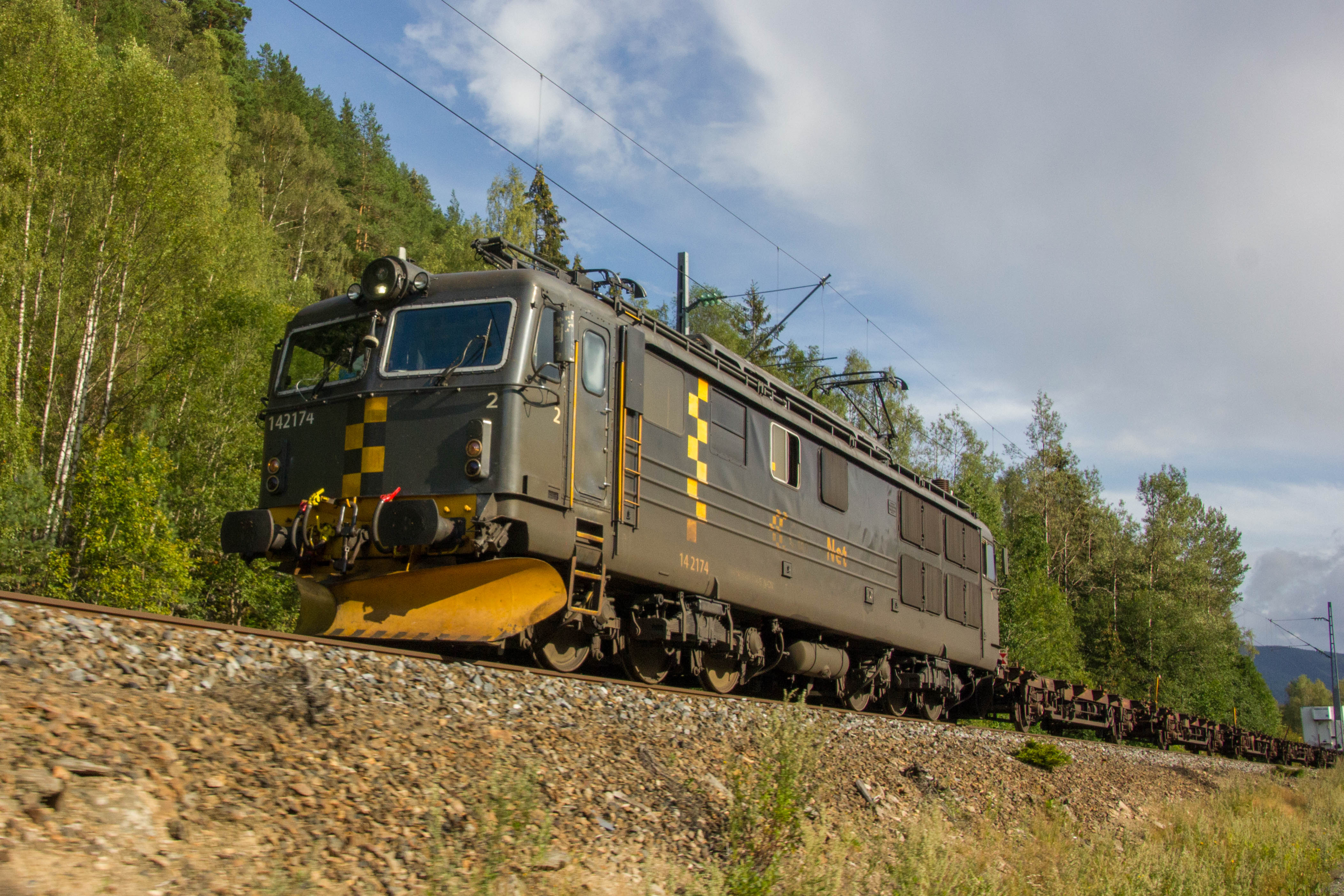
- View of a train just north of Holtsås
- Interactive map of Holtsås
- Coordinates: 59.45682°N 9.33939°E
- Country: Norway
- Region: Eastern Norway
- County: Telemark
- District: Aust-Telemark
- Municipality: Midt-Telemark Municipality
- Elevation: 128 m (420 ft)
- Time zone: UTC+01:00 (CET)
  - Summer (DST): UTC+02:00 (CEST)
- Post Code: 3683 Notodden

Holtsås is a village in Midt-Telemark Municipality in Telemark county, Norway. The village is located near the south end of the lake Heddalsvatnet, about 5 kilometres (3.1 mi) south of the village of Hjuksebø (in Notodden Municipality) and about 4 kilometres (2.5 mi) north of the village of Nordagutu.

Holtsås used to have a train station on the Sørlandet Line. The Hjuksebø train disaster occurred between Hjuksebø and Holtsås on 15 November 1950, and was Norway's worst railway accident in peacetime until the Tretten train disaster in 1975.
