= Liv Holtskog =

Norwegian poet (1934–2014)

- Born: 4 August 1934; Gvarv, Norway
- Died: 21 July 2014 (aged 79)
- Occupations: fruit farmer and poet

Liv Holtskog (4 August 1934 – 21 July 2014) was a Norwegian fruit farmer and poet. She was born in Gvarv. She made her literary debut in 1966 with the poetry collection Kanskje ein. Other collections are Dagane millom from 1969, Skurdsong from 1971, and Det lova landet from 1974. Her poetry contains motifs from the Telemark nature, biblical motifs, and allusions to fairy tales. Several of her poems are used as songs, and some have been performed as choral works. Among composers who have made melodies to her works are Gisle Kverndokk and Sigmund Groven.
