= Arne Haukvik =

Norwegian politician

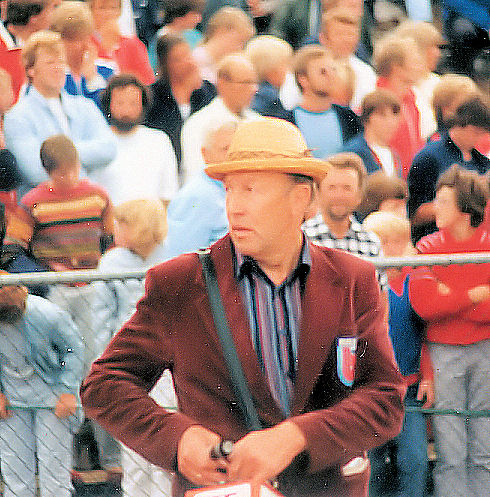
Arne Haukvik with his straw hat.

Arne Haukvik (12 February 1926 – 21 August 2002) was a Norwegian sports official for IL i BUL and politician for the Centre Party and the Pensioners Party. He is best known for founding the Bislett Games. As a politician, he was a four-term member of Oslo city council and a one-term member of the Parliament of Norway.

== Professional life and sports ==
He was born in Sauherad Municipality as a son of farmers Halvor Haukvik (1894–1969) and Gunhild Røste (1898–1977). He was a brother of politician Olav Haukvik. The village he grew up in was Hjuksebø. He attended folk high school before finishing his secondary education in 1948, and taking commerce school in 1950. He also served in the Independent Norwegian Brigade Group in Germany. He worked as a bookseller from 1950 to 1952, then various jobs in the United States until 1955 before returning to bookselling. From 1961 to 1963 he was a sales manager in the publishing house Det Norske Samlaget, before becoming a sales consultant in Centralfilm from 1963 to 1966.

By that time he had involved himself in track and field administration. He was the deputy chairman of the Norwegian Amateur Athletics Association from 1952 to 1955, board member of Bondeungdomslaget (BUL) in Oslo from 1956 to 2000 (deputy chairman from 1959 to 1960, chairman from 1960 to 1963) and chairman of its sports section IL i BUL from 1964 to 1971. He was also a board member of the Bislett Alliance with responsibility for public relations from 1965 to 2000. He strongly contributed to founding the modern Bislett Games, which started with the booking of Ron Clarke to the meet in 1965, who set a world record in the 10,000 metres at Bislett stadion. Haukvik was also involved in arranging the Oslo Marathon, the road relay Holmenkollstafetten and the skiing event BUL-sprinten.

From the 1970s to 1998 Haukvik was the vice president of Euromeeting, a cooperation organization for venues of large sports events. He also had a daytime job in the Norwegian Skiing Federation from 1966 to 1970. After working in a humanitarian organization from 1970 to 1973 and being a municipal employee in Oslo from 1974 to 1981, he returned to the sports world as market director of Norsk Rikstoto from 1981 to 1984 and consultant in Sponsor-Service from 1984 to 1991.

Haukvik became an honorary member of IL i BUL in 1983 and BUL (in Oslo) in 1989. He was decorated with The King's Medal of Merit in gold in 2002, and held several sports-related awards, including the highest decoration from the Norwegian Athletics Association.

Haukvik also became known for wearing a straw hat frequently. A book about him, released in 2001, was titled Arne med stråhatten; "Arne With the Straw Hat". He also instituted the "strawberry party" of the Bislett Games, where the competitors were invited to his own home garden. The party has been carried on as a press conference-style event.

== Political career ==
Haukvik was a member of Oslo city council from 1967 to 1979 and 1991 to 1995, from 1971 to 1973 in the executive committee. He was a board member for the Centre Party in Oslo from 1967 to 1997. In the 1993 Norwegian parliamentary election he was elected to the Parliament of Norway from Oslo. He was a member of the Standing Committee on Family, Culture and Administration. He was not renominated on top of the party ballot for the next election, only fifth, and then withdrew from the Centre Party to serve in spring 1997 as an independent. He joined the Pensioners Party.

Haukvik suffered from a haemorrhal bleeding in 1998, and his health declined after 2000. He died at the nursing home at Furuset in August 2002.
