= Akkerhaugen =

Village in Midt-Telemark Municipality, Norway

- Village
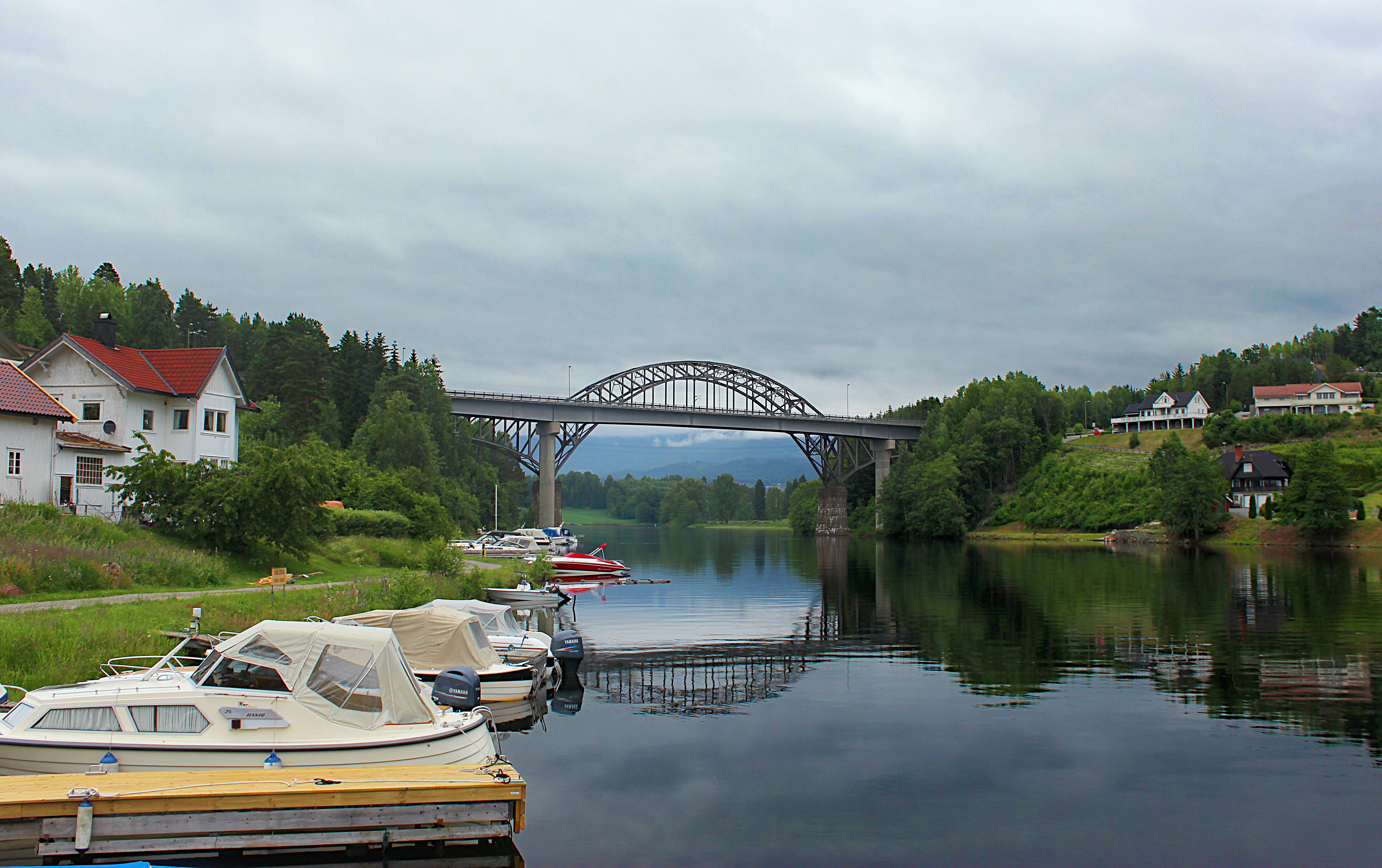
- View of the bridge in Akkerhaugen
- Interactive map of Akkerhaugen
- Coordinates: 59.39509°N 9.25128°E
- Country: Norway
- Region: Eastern Norway
- County: Telemark
- District: Aust-Telemark
- Municipality: Midt-Telemark Municipality

Area
  - Total: 0.64 km^{2} (0.25 sq mi)
- Elevation: 56 m (184 ft)

Population (2012)
  - Total: 378
  - Density: 591/km^{2} (1,530/sq mi)
- Time zone: UTC+01:00 (CET)
  - Summer (DST): UTC+02:00 (CEST)
- Post Code: 3812 Akkerhaugen

Akkerhaugen is a village in Midt-Telemark Municipality in Telemark county, Norway. The village is located at the mouth of the river Sauarelva where it empties into the north end of the large lake Norsjø. The village of Sauherad lies about 3.5 kilometres (2.2 mi) to the north, the village of Nordagutu lies about 5 kilometres (3.1 mi) to the northeast, and the village of Gvarv is located about 5 kilometres (3.1 mi) to the west.

The 0.64-square-kilometre (160-acre) village had a population (2012) of 378 and a population density of 590 inhabitants per square kilometre (1,500/sq mi). Since 2012, the population and area data for this village area has not been separately tracked by Statistics Norway.

The Sørlandsbanen railway line runs through the village. Akkerhaugen is also the location of Norsjø ferieland.

== History ==
The village was the administrative centre of the old Sauherad Municipality which existed from 1838 until 2020.
