= Pensioners' Party (Norway) =

Norwegian political party

Pensioners' Party Pensjonistpartiet
- Leader: Kurt Johhny Hæggernes (2023)
- Founded: 1985
- Headquarters: Prinsens gate 3 A 0152 Oslo
- Ideology: Single-issue politics Pensioners' interests
- Colours: Dark purple, periwinkle
- Parliament: 0 / 169
- County Councils: 3 / 728
- Municipal Councils: 84 / 10,781

Website
- pensjonistpartiet.no

The Pensioners' Party (Norwegian: Pensjonistpartiet) is a political party in Norway without parliamentary representation. It was founded in 1985 to work for the interests of pensioners, and the party mainly focuses on issues related to health care, taxes, and pensioners.

The party has never been elected to parliament. However, former MP Arne Haukvik, elected on the Centre Party (Sp) list in 1993, joined the party before the 1997 election after he was not renominated by the Sp. The party has representatives in the local councils of some cities and county assemblies.

== Electoral results ==
=== Storting ===
Election	Leader	Votes	%	Seats	+/–	Position	Status
1985		7,846	0.3	0 / 157	New	10th	Extra-parliamentary
1989		7,863	0.3	0 / 165	0	▼12th	Extra-parliamentary
1993		25,835	1.0	0 / 165	0	▲9th	Extra-parliamentary
1997		16,031	0.6	0 / 165	0	9th	Extra-parliamentary
2001	Johnny H. Jacobsen	17,940	0.7	0 / 165	0	▼11th	Extra-parliamentary
2005	Ragnar Dahl	13,556	0.5	0 / 169	0	▲10th	Extra-parliamentary
2009	Ragnar Dahl	11,900	0.4	0 / 169	0	▲9th	Extra-parliamentary
2013	Einar Lonstad	11,865	0.4	0 / 169	0	▼11th	Extra-parliamentary
2017	Einar Lonstad	12,855	0.4	0 / 169	0	▲10th	Extra-parliamentary
2021	Ottar Gjermundnes	19,002	0.6	0 / 169	0	▼11th	Extra-parliamentary
2025	Kurt Johhny Hæggernes	26,839	0.8	0 / 169	0	▲10th	Extra-parliamentary

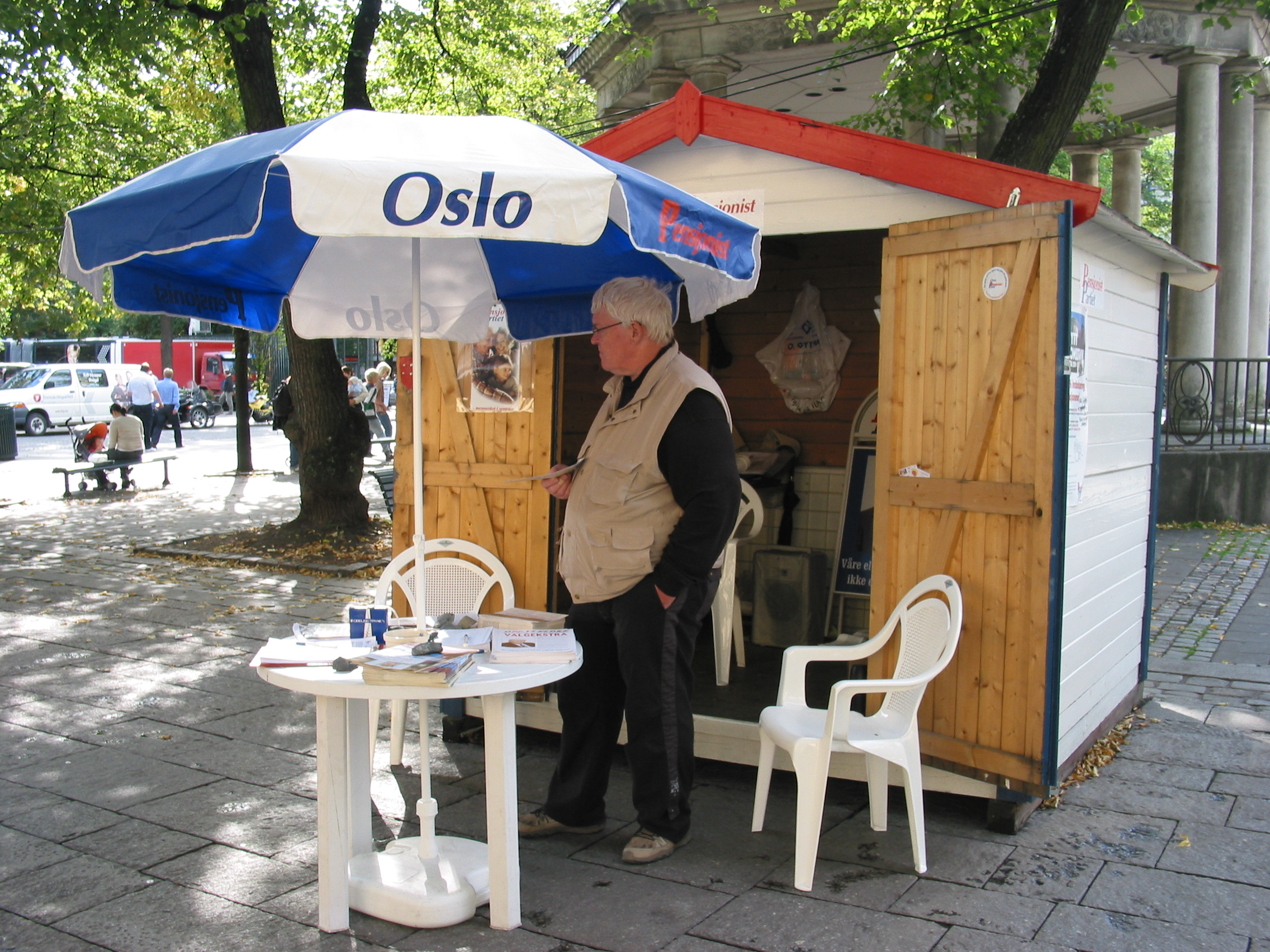
Campaign booth ahead of the 2009 election
