= Enevold Steenblock Høyum =

Norwegian military officer

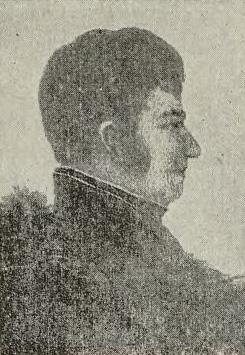
- Born: 15 May 1775; Søfde prestegjeld, Norway
- Died: 24 January 1830 (aged 54)
- Occupation: military officer
- Known for: representative at the Norwegian Constitutional Assembly

Enevold Steenblock Høyum (15 May 1775 – 24 January 1830) was a Norwegian military officer who served as a representative at the Norwegian Constitutional Assembly.

He was born in the Søfde prestegjeld in Telemark, Norway. He was the oldest of six siblings. The family moved to the Haug gård (farm) in Søfde during his youth. He entered military service and in 1794 became Second Lieutenant in Telemark Infantry Regiment (Tellemarkske Infanterie Regiment). He advanced through the ranks became Captain in 1809.

Together with Commander Gullik Madsen Røed, he represented Telemark Infantry Regiment at the Norwegian Constituent Assembly at Eidsvoll Manor in 1814. They both voted with the independence party (Selvstendighetspartiet).

In 1810, he married Edel Maria Thornson with whom he was the father of six children. After his retirement from military service, they lived on Søve gård at Holden in Telemark.

== Related Reading ==
- Holme, Jørn (2014) De kom fra alle kanter – Eidsvollsmennene og deres hus (Oslo: Cappelen Damm) ISBN 978-82-02-44564-5
