= Gvarv =

Village in Midt-Telemark Municipality, Norway

- Village
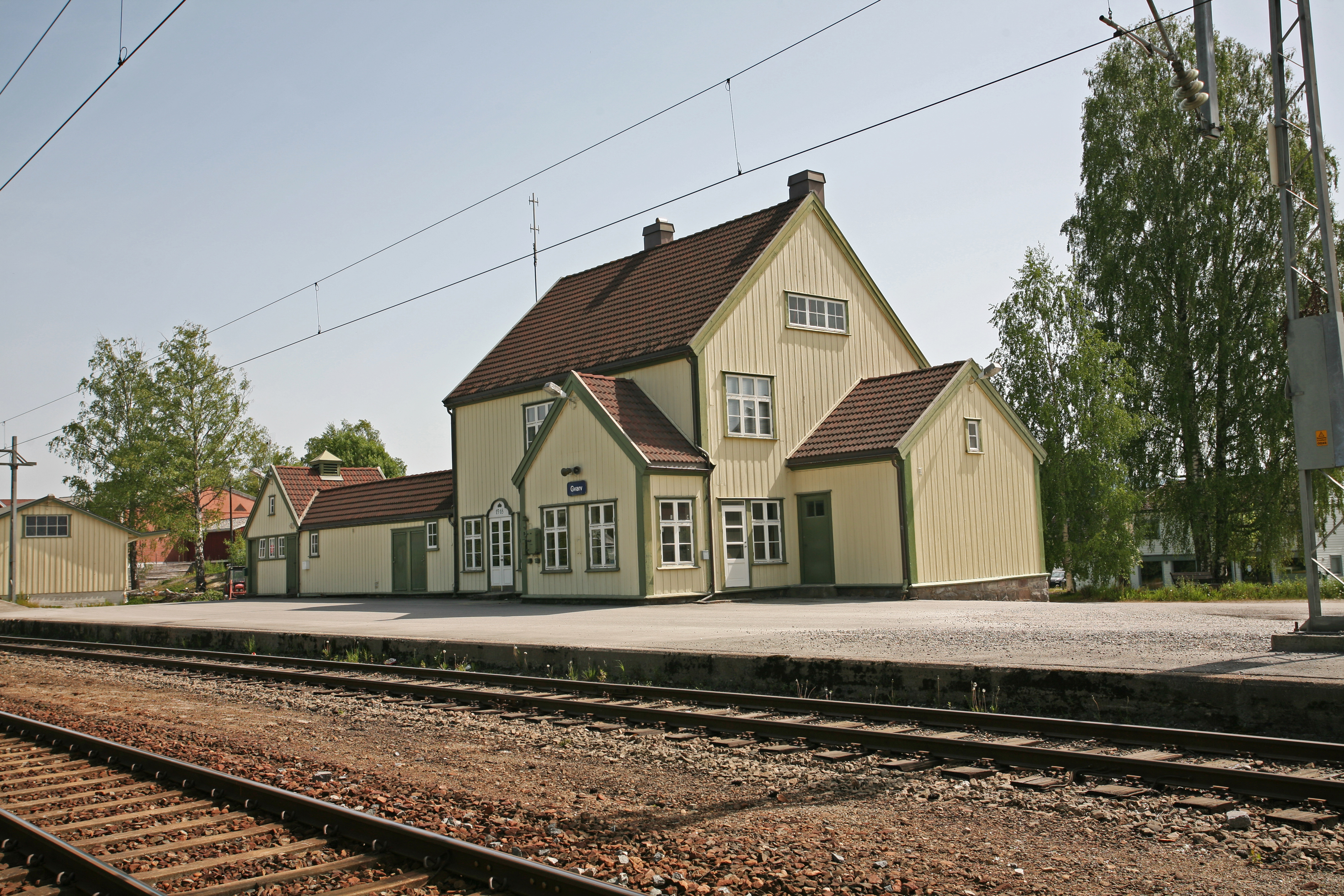
- View of the village railway station
- Interactive map of Gvarv
- Coordinates: 59.38766°N 9.17243°E
- Country: Norway
- Region: Eastern Norway
- County: Telemark
- District: Aust-Telemark
- Municipality: Midt-Telemark Municipality

Area
  - Total: 1.32 km^{2} (0.51 sq mi)
- Elevation: 17 m (56 ft)

Population (2025)
  - Total: 1,111
  - Density: 842/km^{2} (2,180/sq mi)
- Time zone: UTC+01:00 (CET)
  - Summer (DST): UTC+02:00 (CEST)
- Post Code: 3810 Gvarv

Gvarv is a village in Midt-Telemark Municipality in Telemark county, Norway. The village is located along the river Gvarvelva, just 1 kilometre (0.62 mi) from where the river empties into the large lake Norsjø. The village of Bø lies about 7 kilometres (4.3 mi) to the northwest, the village of Akkerhaugen lies about 5 kilometres (3.1 mi) to the east, and the village of Ulefoss lies about 15 kilometres (9.3 mi) to the southeast.

The 1.32-square-kilometre (330-acre) village has a population (2025) of 1,111 and a population density of 842 inhabitants per square kilometre (2,180/sq mi).

Gvarv is a farming area, noted for its apples, sweet cherries, and sour cherries (as is the whole area of the old Sauherad Municipality). It is also notable for growing grapes and producing wine (which is unusual in Norway).

Gvarv also hosts the apple festival Eplefest and used to host the music festival Kartfestivalen.

The Norwegian painter Erik Werenskiold painted a number of his famous rustic landscapes, such as Telemarksjenter ("Girls from Telemark"), in the vicinity of Gvarv.

Sagavoll folkehøgskole (folk high school) is located in Gvarv and the Nes Church lies about 3 kilometres (1.9 mi) to the southeast of the village on the Nes peninsula.

== Name ==
The village is named after the old Gvarv farm (Old Norse: Hvarf). The name is identical to the word hvarf which means "bend" or "bow" (here referring to the turn in the lower part of the river Gvarvelva.

== Climate ==
Climate data for Gvarv - Nes 1991–2020 (93 m, avg high/low 1998-2025)
Month	Jan	Feb	Mar	Apr	May	Jun	Jul	Aug	Sep	Oct	Nov	Dec	Year
Mean daily maximum °C (°F)	0.3 (32.5)	2.2 (36.0)	6.7 (44.1)	11.8 (53.2)	17.1 (62.8)	20.8 (69.4)	22.8 (73.0)	21.4 (70.5)	17.2 (63.0)	10.4 (50.7)	4.7 (40.5)	0.8 (33.4)	11.4 (52.4)
Daily mean °C (°F)	−2.8 (27.0)	−2.1 (28.2)	1.3 (34.3)	5.8 (42.4)	10.9 (51.6)	14.7 (58.5)	16.9 (62.4)	15.6 (60.1)	11.6 (52.9)	6 (43)	1.4 (34.5)	−2.2 (28.0)	6.4 (43.6)
Mean daily minimum °C (°F)	−5.5 (22.1)	−5 (23)	−2.5 (27.5)	1.3 (34.3)	5.7 (42.3)	9.7 (49.5)	11.9 (53.4)	10.9 (51.6)	8.1 (46.6)	3.3 (37.9)	−0.6 (30.9)	−4.5 (23.9)	2.7 (36.9)
Average precipitation mm (inches)	58 (2.3)	34 (1.3)	41 (1.6)	40 (1.6)	65 (2.6)	78 (3.1)	90 (3.5)	103 (4.1)	83 (3.3)	77 (3.0)	73 (2.9)	46 (1.8)	788 (31.1)
Source: yr.no (mean, precipitaiton)

Climate data for Gvarv (1959-1988, extremes 1919- also include Lindem and Nes meteorological stations)
Month	Jan	Feb	Mar	Apr	May	Jun	Jul	Aug	Sep	Oct	Nov	Dec	Year
Record high °C (°F)	12.2 (54.0)	14.9 (58.8)	21.6 (70.9)	24.9 (76.8)	31.1 (88.0)	34.4 (93.9)	32.9 (91.2)	34.3 (93.7)	27.2 (81.0)	22.5 (72.5)	15.6 (60.1)	13.4 (56.1)	34.4 (93.9)
Mean maximum °C (°F)	5.8 (42.4)	7.3 (45.1)	12.1 (53.8)	17.5 (63.5)	24.2 (75.6)	28.4 (83.1)	27.8 (82.0)	26.7 (80.1)	22.1 (71.8)	16.9 (62.4)	10.7 (51.3)	7.6 (45.7)	28.4 (83.1)
Mean daily maximum °C (°F)	−3.2 (26.2)	−0.9 (30.4)	4.5 (40.1)	10.2 (50.4)	16.6 (61.9)	21.2 (70.2)	22.1 (71.8)	21.1 (70.0)	16.1 (61.0)	10 (50)	3 (37)	−1.3 (29.7)	10.0 (49.9)
Daily mean °C (°F)	−7.1 (19.2)	−6.3 (20.7)	−1 (30)	4.3 (39.7)	10.2 (50.4)	14.8 (58.6)	15.9 (60.6)	14.6 (58.3)	10 (50)	5.6 (42.1)	−0.3 (31.5)	−4.8 (23.4)	4.7 (40.4)
Mean daily minimum °C (°F)	−10.9 (12.4)	−10.7 (12.7)	−5.4 (22.3)	−0.9 (30.4)	4 (39)	8.2 (46.8)	9.9 (49.8)	8.8 (47.8)	5.3 (41.5)	2.2 (36.0)	−3.2 (26.2)	−8.2 (17.2)	−0.1 (31.8)
Mean minimum °C (°F)	−21.8 (−7.2)	−22.5 (−8.5)	−16.4 (2.5)	−7 (19)	−2.3 (27.9)	2.4 (36.3)	4.6 (40.3)	2.8 (37.0)	−1.6 (29.1)	−4.8 (23.4)	−12.6 (9.3)	−19.2 (−2.6)	−22.5 (−8.5)
Record low °C (°F)	−36.1 (−33.0)	−37.8 (−36.0)	−29.6 (−21.3)	−18.9 (−2.0)	−5.7 (21.7)	−1.8 (28.8)	1 (34)	−0.9 (30.4)	−5.9 (21.4)	−11.3 (11.7)	−23.1 (−9.6)	−28.6 (−19.5)	−37.8 (−36.0)
Average precipitation mm (inches)	48 (1.9)	32 (1.3)	43 (1.7)	33 (1.3)	65 (2.6)	63 (2.5)	86 (3.4)	94 (3.7)	96 (3.8)	98 (3.9)	90 (3.5)	52 (2.0)	800 (31.6)
Source: Norwegian Meteorological Institute (eKlima)
