= Kristen Idrettskontakt =

Norwegian Christian sports organization

KRIK (Kristen Idrettskontakt, meaning Christian Sports Contact) is a Norwegian Christian youth and sports organisation. KRIK was founded in 1981 on initiative by the Norwegian priest Kjell Markset. The nationwide administration is currently located at Ullevål Stadium in Oslo.

The organisation has a central administration, and has about 250 local groups in Norway, and many others through the sister organisation CHRISC, Christian Sports Contact, in Uganda, Kenya, Tanzania and Sudan. In 2006, KRIK had around 12,000 registered members in Norway. CHRISC had approximately 18,000 members in East Africa.

In Norway, KRIK arranges several large sports festivals around the country, including 'Arena' in Kristiansand, 'Action' in Bø in Telemark and 'Explore' in Lillehammer
