= Midt-Telemark Municipality =

Municipality in Telemark, Norway

Midt-Telemark Municipality Midt-Telemark kommune
- Municipality
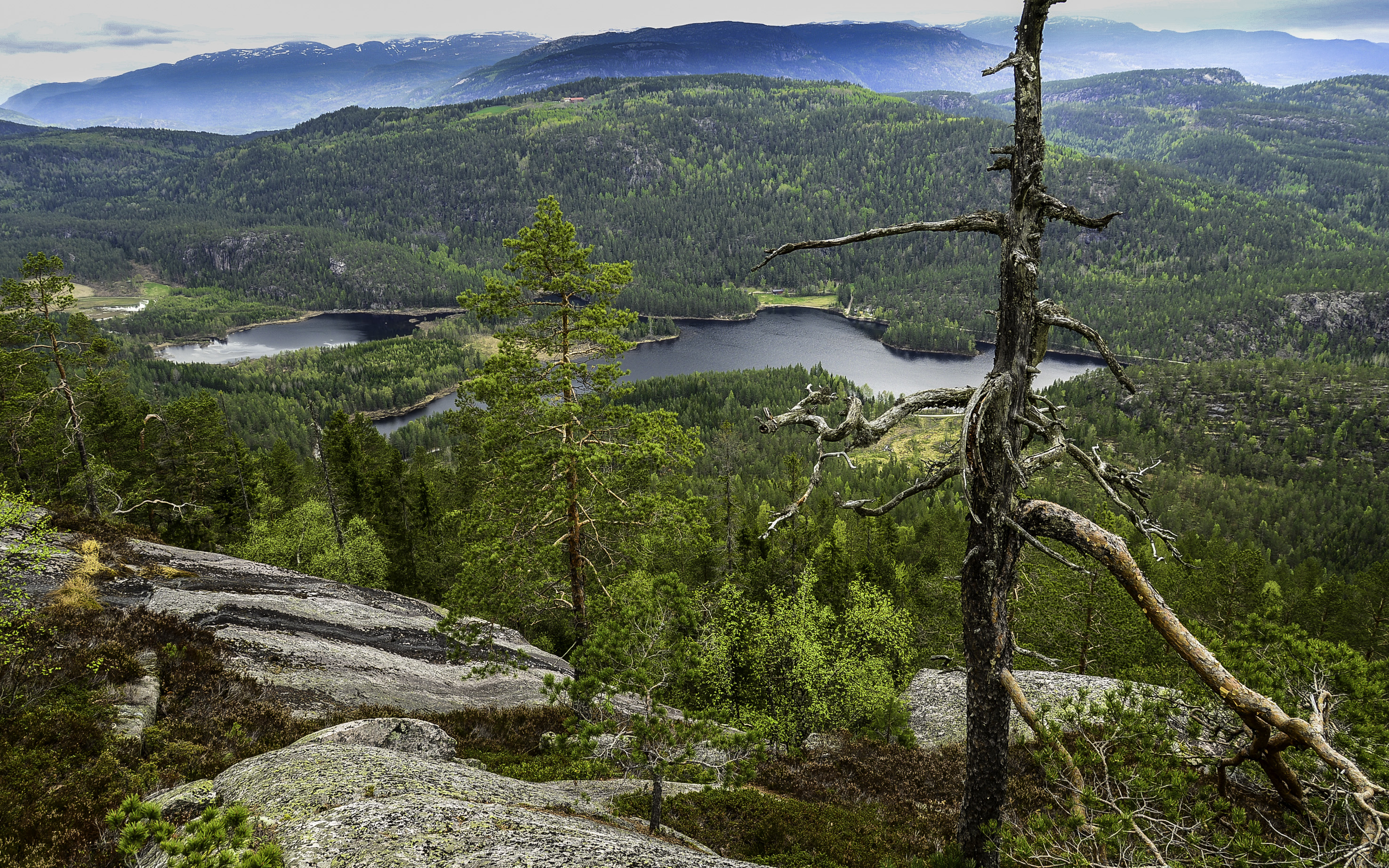
- Gyrestolen in Bø

- Coat of arms

- Telemark within Norway

- Midt-Telemark within Telemark
- Coordinates: 59°27′00″N 9°06′00″E
- Country: Norway
- County: Telemark
- District: Midt-Telemark
- Established: 1 January 2020
  - Preceded by: Bø Municipality and Sauherad Municipality
- Administrative centre: Bø

Government
  - Mayor (2020): Siri Blichfeldt Dyrland (Sp)

Area
  - Total: 518.51 km^{2} (200.20 sq mi)
  - Land: 487.08 km^{2} (188.06 sq mi)
  - Water: 31.43 km^{2} (12.14 sq mi) 6.1%
  - Rank: #203 in Norway
- Highest elevation: 1,273.46 m (4,178.0 ft)

Population (2026)
  - Total: 11,157
  - Rank: #104 in Norway
  - Density: 22.9/km^{2} (59/sq mi)
  - Change (10 years): ▲ +6.9%
- Demonym(s): Midt-telemarking; Midt-teledøl

Official language
  - Norwegian form: Nynorsk
- Time zone: UTC+01:00 (CET)
  - Summer (DST): UTC+02:00 (CEST)
- ISO 3166 code: NO-4020
- Website: Official website

Midt-Telemark (Norwegian pronunciation: [ˈmɪt·ˈteːləmɑɾk]; locally [ˈmɪt·ˈteːɽmɑɾk]) is a municipality in Telemark county, Norway. It is located in the traditional district of Midt-Telemark. The administrative centre of the municipality is the village of Bø i Telemark. Other villages in the municipality include Akkerhaugen, Folkestad, Gvarv, Holtsås, Nordagutu, Nordbøåsane, and Sauherad.

The 518.51-square-kilometre (200.20 sq mi) municipality is the 203rd largest by area out of the 357 municipalities in Norway. Midt-Telemark Municipality is the 104th most populous municipality in Norway with a population of 11,157. The municipality's population density is 22.9 inhabitants per square kilometre (59/sq mi) and its population has increased by 6.9% over the previous 10-year period.

== General information ==
=== Administrative history ===
In 2020, there were many municipal and county mergers across Norway due to the work of the Solberg cabinet. The municipality of Midt-Telemark was established on 1 January 2020 when Bø Municipality (population: 6,630) and Sauherad Municipality (population: 4,293) were merged to form the new Midt-Telemark Municipality. Also on the same date, the Hjukse area of Sauherad Municipality was transferred to the neighboring Notodden Municipality.

=== Name ===
The municipality is named after the traditional district of Midt-Telemark. The first element is the prefix midt which means "middle". The last element is Telemark which is the historic name for the county. The name Telemark means the "mark of the Thelir", the ancient North Germanic tribe that inhabited what is now known as Upper Telemark in the Migration Period and the Viking Age.

=== Coat of arms ===
The coat of arms was approved for use starting on 1 January 2020 when the new Midt-Telemark municipality was established. The new arms were a combination of the arms for the two preceding municipalities that formed Midt-Telemark. The colors of the coat of arms of Sauherad and the design of the coat of arms of Bø were used. The official blazon is "Azure, three fiddles Or" (Norwegian: I blått tre gull feler, 2-1). This means the arms have a blue field (background) and the charge is a set of three fiddles (two over one). The charge has a tincture of Or which means it is commonly colored yellow, but if it is made out of metal, then gold is used. Bø is historically known for its musical tradition, as well as the production of fiddles (similar to the hardingfele). The fiddle was thus chosen as an appropriate symbol for the municipality. The original design of the Bø arms were designed by Halvor Holtskog, Jr.

=== Churches ===
The Church of Norway has two parishes (sokn) within Midt-Telemark Municipality. It is part of the Øvre Telemark prosti (deanery) in the Diocese of Agder og Telemark.

Churches in Midt-Telemark Municipality
Parish (sokn)	Church name	Location of the church	Year built
Bø	Bø Church	Bø	1875
Bø	Old Bø Church	Bø	c. 1100
Sauherad og Nes	Nes Church	Nesodden (just outside Gvarv)	c. 1180
Sauherad og Nes	Sauherad Church	Sauherad	c. 1150

== Government ==
Midt-Telemark Municipality is responsible for primary education (through 10th grade), outpatient health services, senior citizen services, welfare and other social services, zoning, economic development, and municipal roads and utilities. The municipality is governed by a municipal council of directly elected representatives. The mayor is indirectly elected by a vote of the municipal council. The municipality is under the jurisdiction of the Øvre Telemark District Court and the Agder Court of Appeal.

=== Municipal council ===
The municipal council (Kommunestyre) of Midt-Telemark Municipality is made up of 29 representatives that are elected to four-year terms. The tables below show the current and historical composition of the council by political party.

Midt-Telemark kommunestyre 2023–2027
Party name (in Nynorsk)	Number of representatives
Labour Party (Arbeidarpartiet)	4
Progress Party (Framstegspartiet)	4
Green Party (Miljøpartiet Dei Grøne)	2
Conservative Party (Høgre)	4
Christian Democratic Party (Kristeleg Folkeparti)	1
Red Party (Raudt)	1
Centre Party (Senterpartiet)	9
Socialist Left Party (Sosialistisk Venstreparti)	2
Liberal Party (Venstre)	2
Total number of members:	29

Midt-Telemark kommunestyre 2019–2023
Party name (in Nynorsk)	Number of representatives
Labour Party (Arbeidarpartiet)	6
Progress Party (Framstegspartiet)	3
Green Party (Miljøpartiet Dei Grøne)	3
Conservative Party (Høgre)	3
Christian Democratic Party (Kristeleg Folkeparti)	1
Red Party (Raudt)	1
Centre Party (Senterpartiet)	9
Socialist Left Party (Sosialistisk Venstreparti)	1
Liberal Party (Venstre)	2
Total number of members:	29
Note: On 1 January 2020, Bø Municipality and Sauherad Municipality were merged to form the new Midt-Telemark Municipality.

=== Mayors ===
The mayor (Nynorsk: ordførar) of Midt-Telemark Municipality is the political leader of the municipality and the chairperson of the municipal council. The following people have held this position:

- 2020–present: Siri Blichfeldt Dyrland (Sp)

== Geography ==
The highest point in the municipality is the 1,273.46-metre (4,178.0 ft) tall mountain Jøronnatten, a tripoint on the border with Notodden Municipality, Seljord Municipality, and Midt-Telemark Municipality.

Notodden Municipality is located to the north, Kongsberg Municipality (in Buskerud county) is located to the northeast, Skien Municipality is located to the east/southeast, Nome Municipality is located to the south, and Seljord Municipality is located to the west.

=== Climate ===
Climate data for Gvarv – Nes 1991–2020 (93 m, avg high/low 1998–2025)
Month	Jan	Feb	Mar	Apr	May	Jun	Jul	Aug	Sep	Oct	Nov	Dec	Year
Mean daily maximum °C (°F)	0.3 (32.5)	2.2 (36.0)	6.7 (44.1)	11.8 (53.2)	17.1 (62.8)	20.8 (69.4)	22.8 (73.0)	21.4 (70.5)	17.2 (63.0)	10.4 (50.7)	4.7 (40.5)	0.8 (33.4)	11.4 (52.4)
Daily mean °C (°F)	−2.8 (27.0)	−2.1 (28.2)	1.3 (34.3)	5.8 (42.4)	10.9 (51.6)	14.7 (58.5)	16.9 (62.4)	15.6 (60.1)	11.6 (52.9)	6 (43)	1.4 (34.5)	−2.2 (28.0)	6.4 (43.6)
Mean daily minimum °C (°F)	−5.5 (22.1)	−5 (23)	−2.5 (27.5)	1.3 (34.3)	5.7 (42.3)	9.7 (49.5)	11.9 (53.4)	10.9 (51.6)	8.1 (46.6)	3.3 (37.9)	−0.6 (30.9)	−4.5 (23.9)	2.7 (36.9)
Average precipitation mm (inches)	58 (2.3)	34 (1.3)	41 (1.6)	40 (1.6)	65 (2.6)	78 (3.1)	90 (3.5)	103 (4.1)	83 (3.3)	77 (3.0)	73 (2.9)	46 (1.8)	788 (31.1)
Source: yr.no (mean, precipitaiton)
