= Tretten train disaster =

1975 railway accident in Norway

Coordinates: 61.3167°N 10.3167°E

The Tretten train disaster occurred on 22 February 1975 when a northbound train (no. 351) from Oslo and a southbound express train (no. 404) from Trondheim, both loaded with vacationing skiers, collided head-on 1 km (0.6 mi) north of Tretten station. With 27 killed, including seven children under 16, and 25 injured, it was the worst train crash in Norwegian peacetime history. One accident victim was from the United States while the rest were Norwegians, including the politician Tønnes Andenæs.

Altogether there were around 800 passengers on the two 12-car trains. Most of those killed were in one car of the northbound train. The operators of both trains survived; one jumped from the cab before the collision. The accident happened because the northbound train, running late, did not wait at Tretten station to let the other pass. One train driver told a newspaper that it was difficult to see the signals because the sun was low in the sky. A station master had cut power to the trains and attempted to warn them, but was too late.

In the aftermath of the disaster new safety precautions were discussed and introduced.
