= Sauherad (village) =

Village in Midt-Telemark Municipality, Norway

- Village
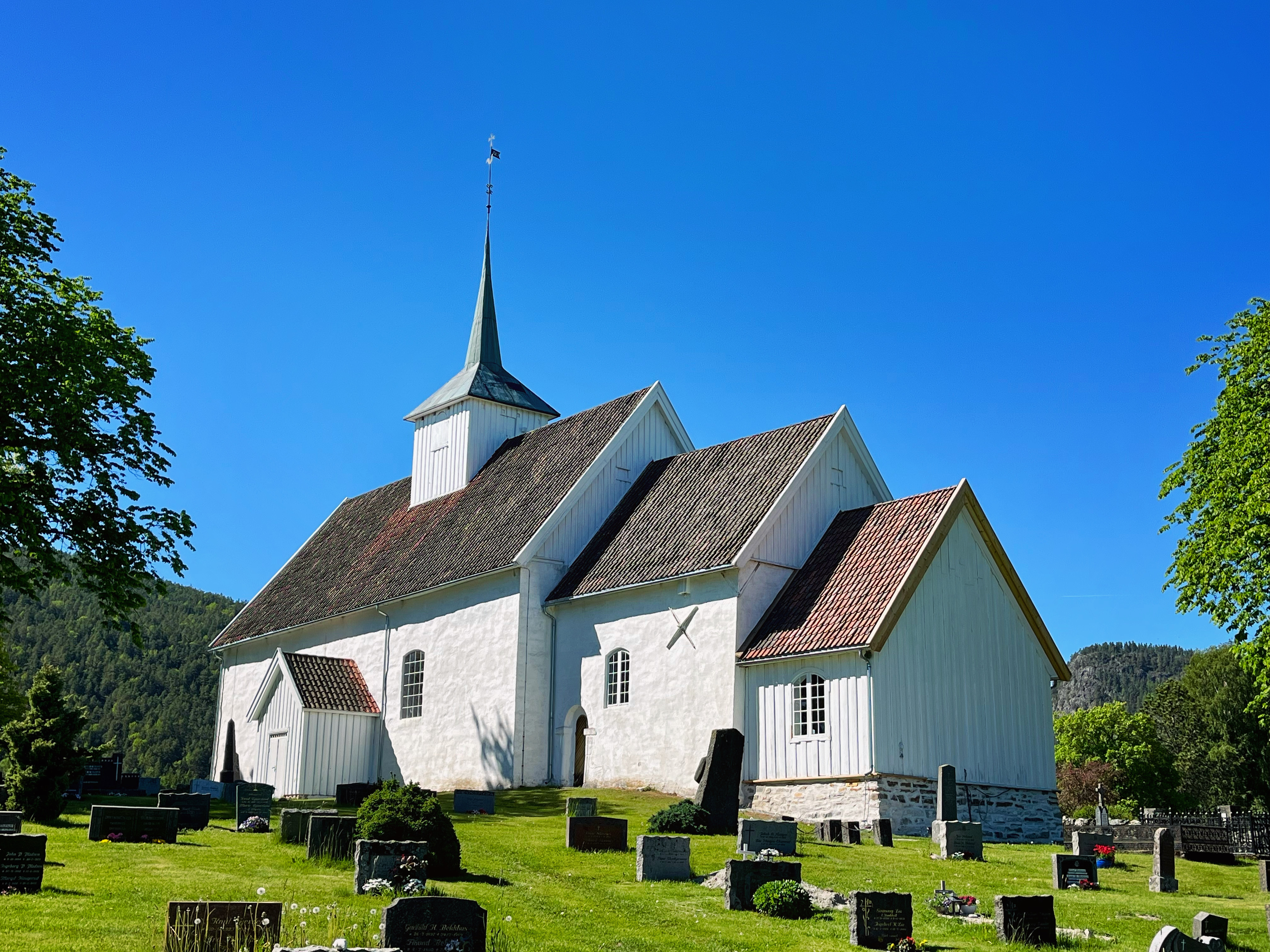
- View of the village church
- Interactive map of Sauherad
- Coordinates: 59.42178°N 9.2811°E
- Country: Norway
- Region: Eastern Norway
- County: Telemark
- District: Aust-Telemark
- Municipality: Midt-Telemark Municipality
- Elevation: 108 m (354 ft)
- Time zone: UTC+01:00 (CET)
  - Summer (DST): UTC+02:00 (CEST)
- Post Code: 3812 Akkerhaugen

Sauherad is a small rural village in Midt-Telemark Municipality in Telemark county, Norway. The village is located on the west shore of the river Sauarelva, about 4 kilometres (2.5 mi) northeast of the village of Akkerhaugen, and across the river from the village of Nordagutu. The Sauherad Church is located in this village.
