= Nordagutu =

Village in Midt-Telemark Municipality, Norway

- Village
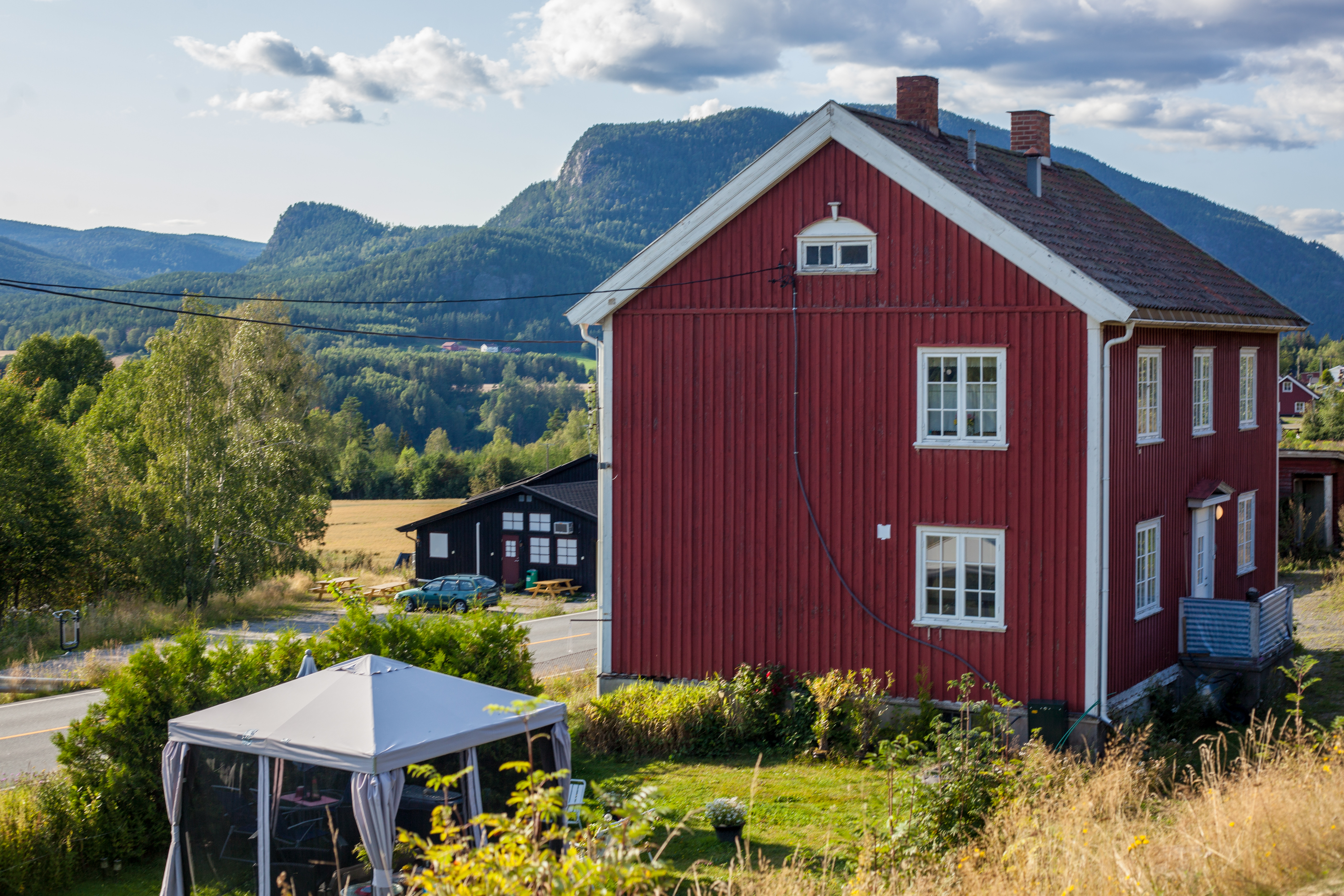
- View of the village in 2019
- Interactive map of Nordagutu
- Coordinates: 59.41641°N 9.32383°E
- Country: Norway
- Region: Eastern Norway
- County: Telemark
- District: Aust-Telemark
- Municipality: Midt-Telemark Municipality

Area
  - Total: 0.37 km^{2} (0.14 sq mi)
- Elevation: 111 m (364 ft)

Population (2025)
  - Total: 297
  - Density: 803/km^{2} (2,080/sq mi)
- Time zone: UTC+01:00 (CET)
  - Summer (DST): UTC+02:00 (CEST)
- Post Code: 3820 Nordagutu

Nordagutu is a village in Midt-Telemark Municipality in Telemark county, Norway. The village is located along the river Sauarelva, just south of the southern end of the lake Heddalsvatnet. The village of lies about 5 kilometres (3.1 mi) south of the village of Holtsås, about 5 kilometres (3.1 mi) northeast of the village of Akkerhaugen, and just across the river from the village of Sauherad.

The 0.37-square-kilometre (91-acre) village has a population (2025) of 297 and a population density of 803 inhabitants per square kilometre (2,080/sq mi).

Nordagutu train station is a part of the Bratsberg Line, and it serves as a junction between the Vestfold Line and Sørlandet Line.
