= Sauherad Church =

Church in Telemark, Norway

- Sauherad kyrkje
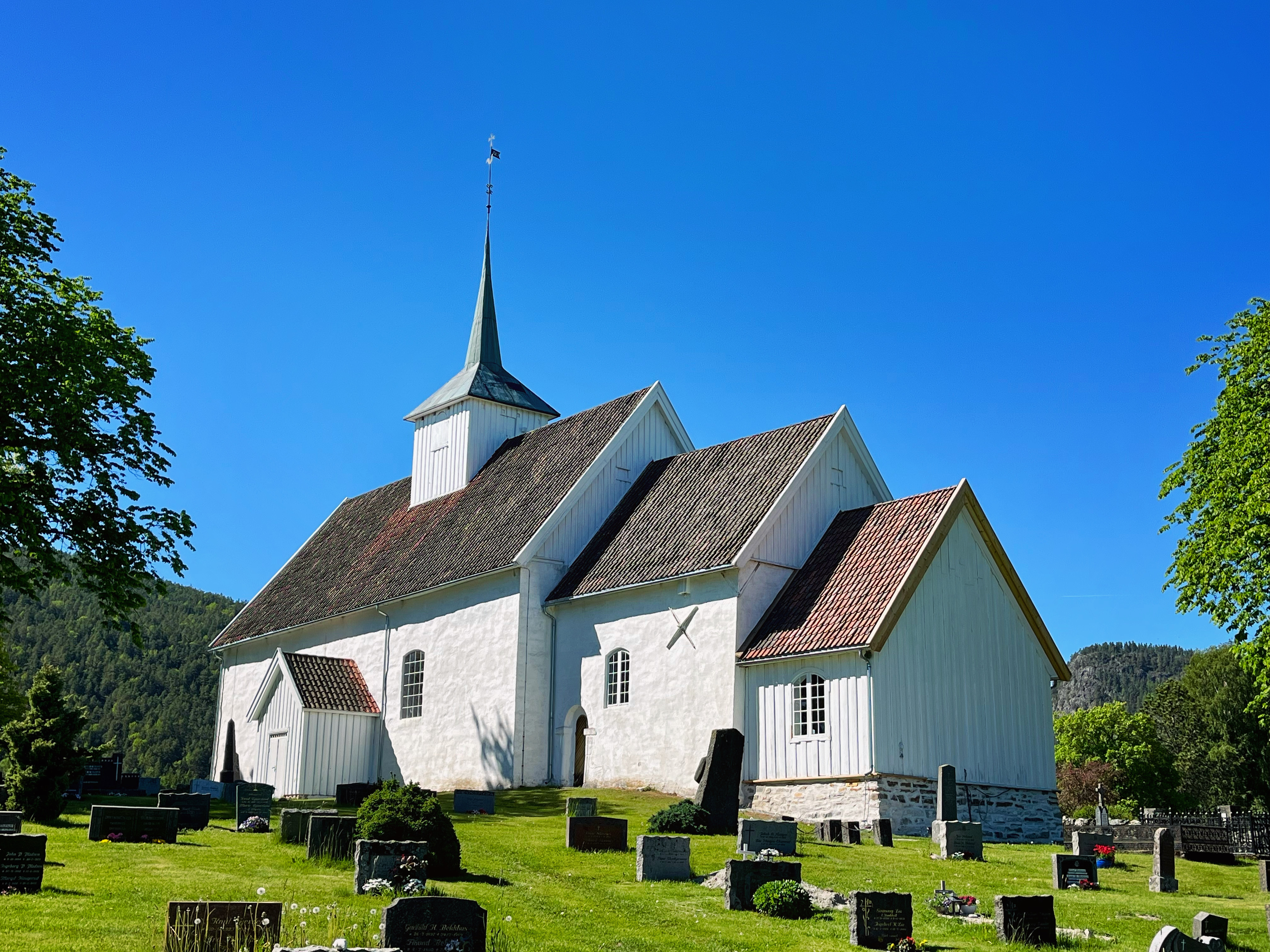
- View of the church
- Sauherad Church
- 59°25′19″N 9°16′52″E
- Location: Midt-Telemark Municipality, Telemark
- Country: Norway
- Denomination: Church of Norway
- Previous denomination: Catholic Church
- Churchmanship: Evangelical Lutheran

History
- Status: Parish church
- Founded: c. 1150

Architecture
- Functional status: Active
- Architectural type: Long church
- Style: Romanesque
- Completed: c.1150 (876 years ago)

Specifications
- Capacity: 260
- Materials: Stone

Administration
- Diocese: Agder og Telemark
- Deanery: Øvre Telemark prosti
- Parish: Sauherad og Nes
- Norwegian Cultural Heritage Site
- Type: Church
- Status: Automatically protected
- ID: 85404

Sauherad Church (Norwegian: Sauherad kirke) is a parish church of the Church of Norway in Midt-Telemark Municipality in Telemark county, Norway. It is located in the village of Sauherad. It is one of the churches for the Nes og Sauherad parish which is part of the Øvre Telemark prosti (deanery) in the Diocese of Agder og Telemark. The white, stone church was built in a long church design around 1150 using plans drawn up by an unknown architect. The church seats about 260 people.

== History ==
The earliest existing historical records of the church date back to the year 1398, but the church was not built that year. The church was likely built around the year 1150, making it one of the oldest existing churches in Telemark. The church has a rectangular nave and a narrower, rectangular choir that has a lower roof line. The church did not originally have a bell tower, but the current bells were made in 1441, so that could be when the bell tower on the centre of the nave roof was constructed. In 1657, the vicarage burned down. In 1711, the roof was replaced and stone was installed on top of the roof to replace the old roof tiles. In 1739, the roof trusses were replaced and iron girders were installed on the walls to help reinforce the cracking in the walls. In 1781, the west wall of the nave was torn down and the nave was enlarged to the west.

In 1814, this church served as an election church (Norwegian: valgkirke). Together with more than 300 other parish churches across Norway, it was a polling station for elections to the 1814 Norwegian Constituent Assembly which wrote the Constitution of Norway. This was Norway's first national elections. Each church parish was a constituency that elected people called "electors" who later met together in each county to elect the representatives for the assembly that was to meet at Eidsvoll Manor later that year.

In 1830, the interior was renovated using plans by Hans Linstow, changing much of the interior furniture. In 1849, a new wooden sacristy was built on the east end of the choir.

== Media gallery ==
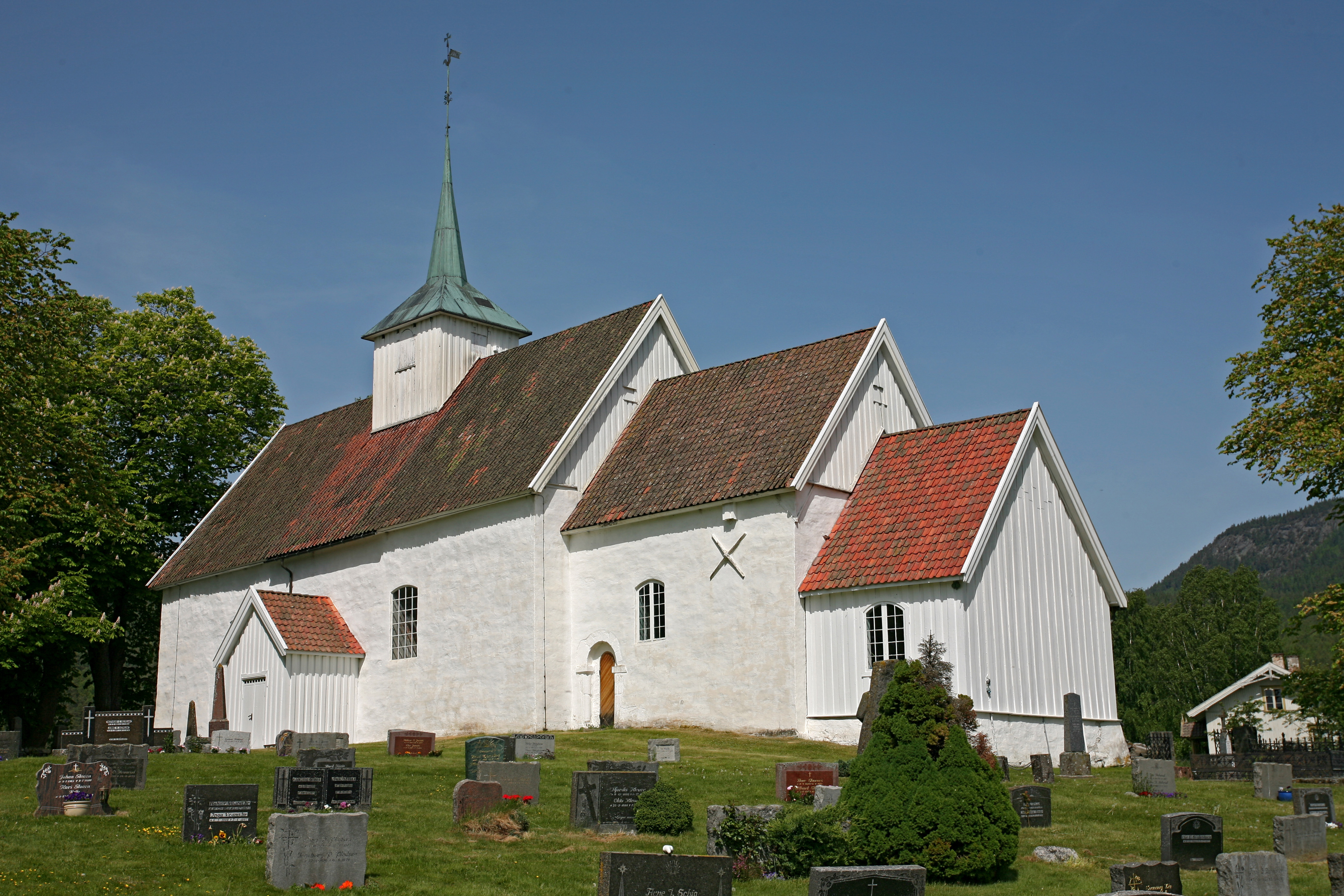

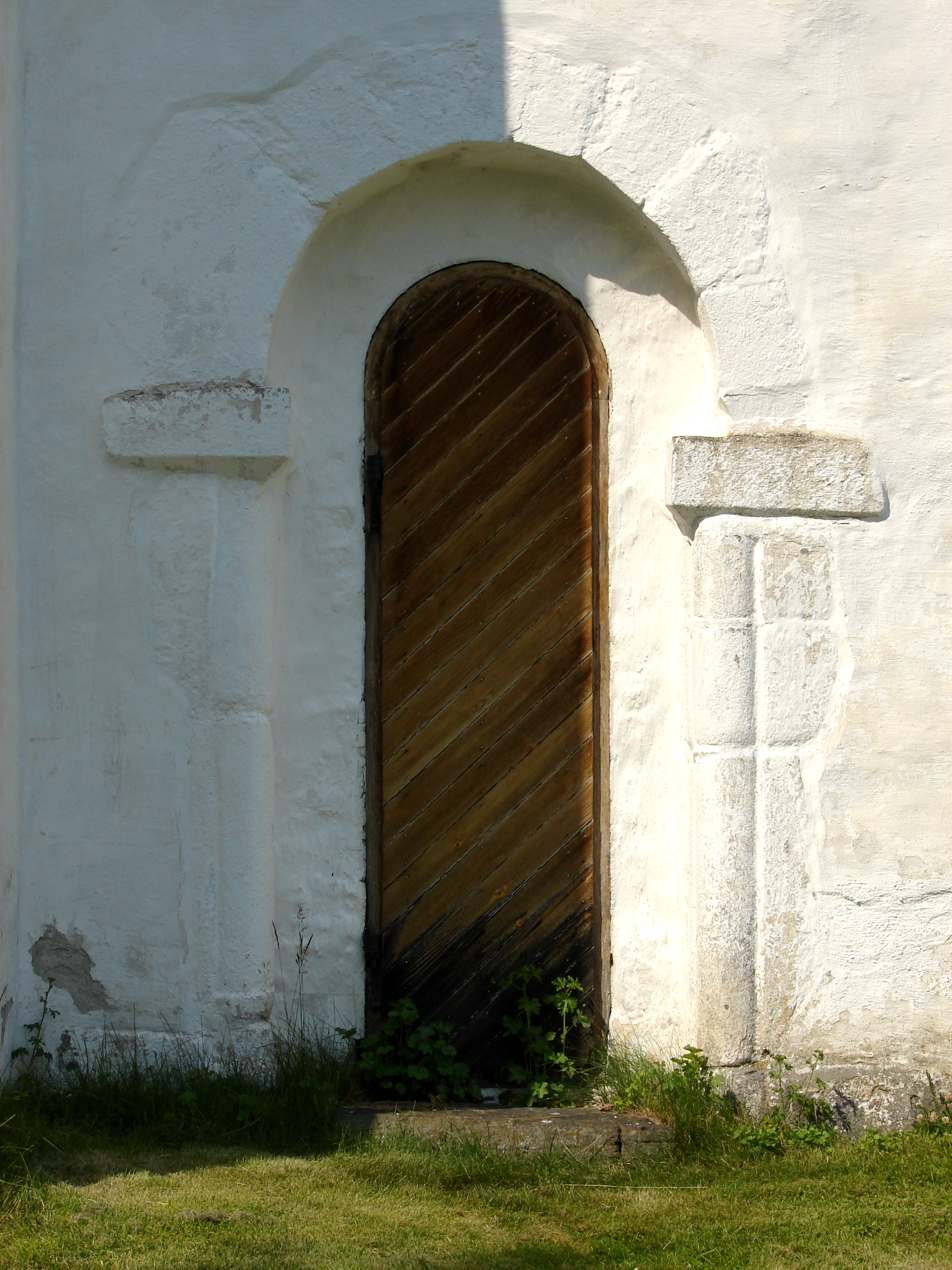

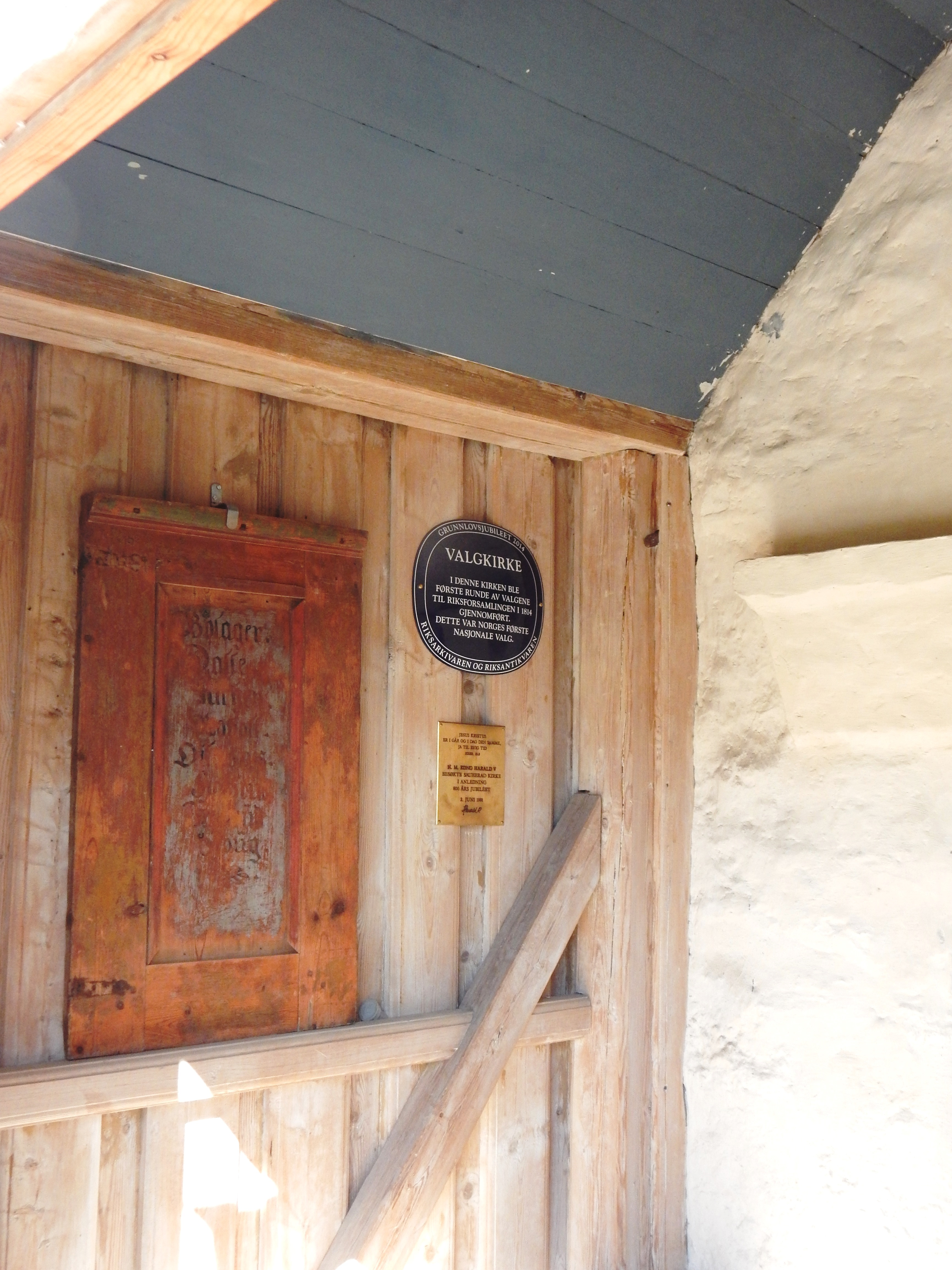

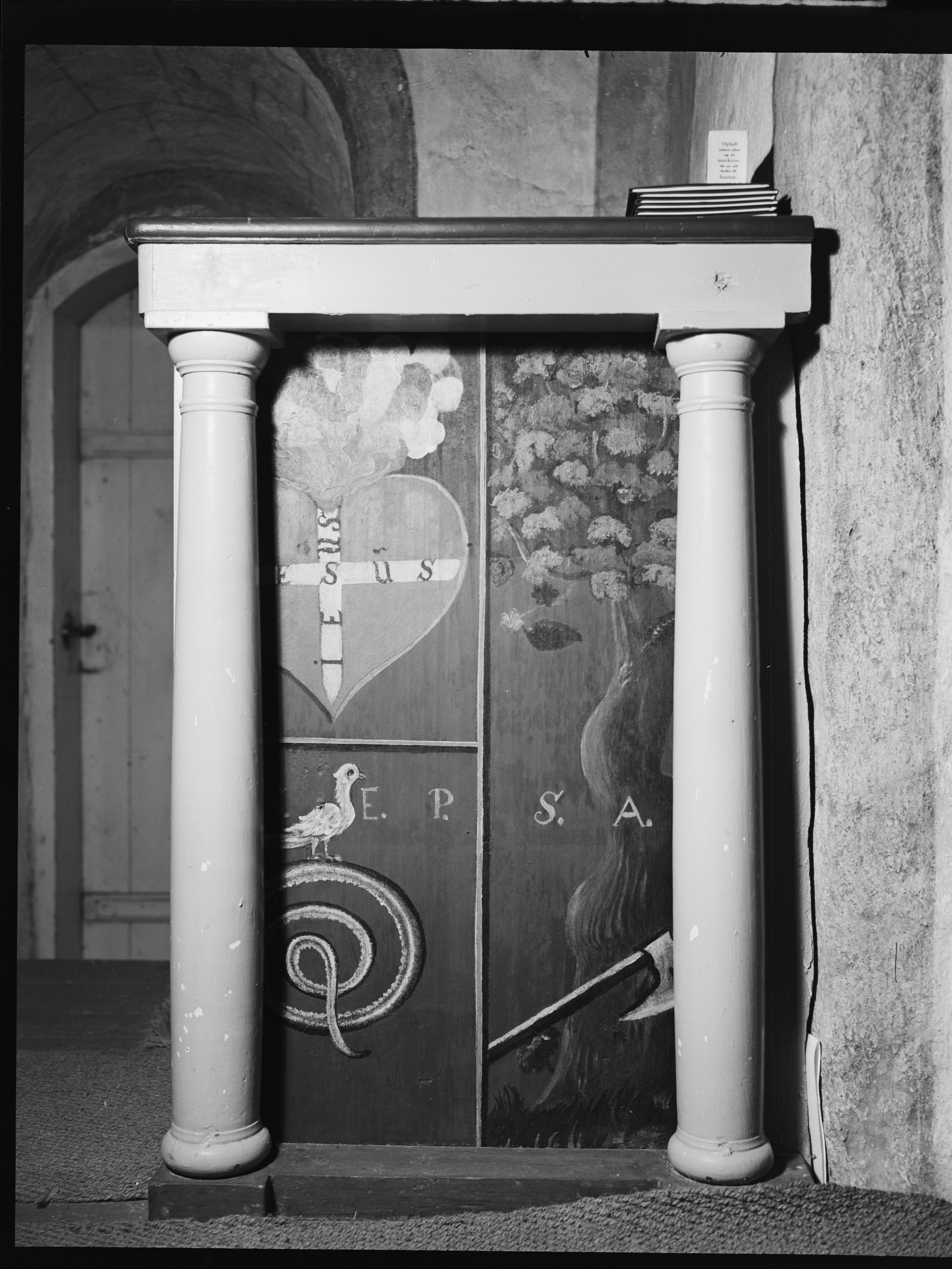

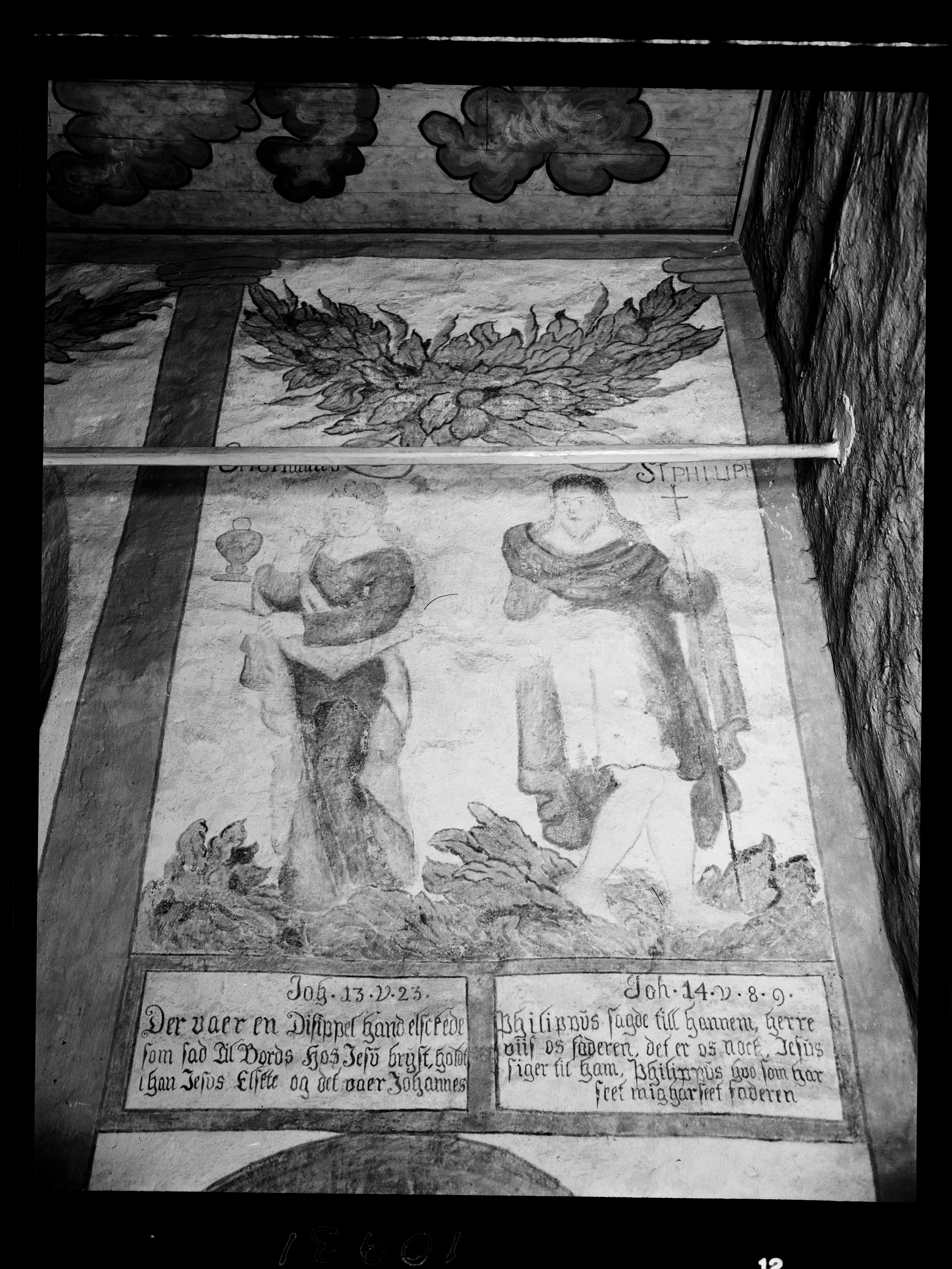

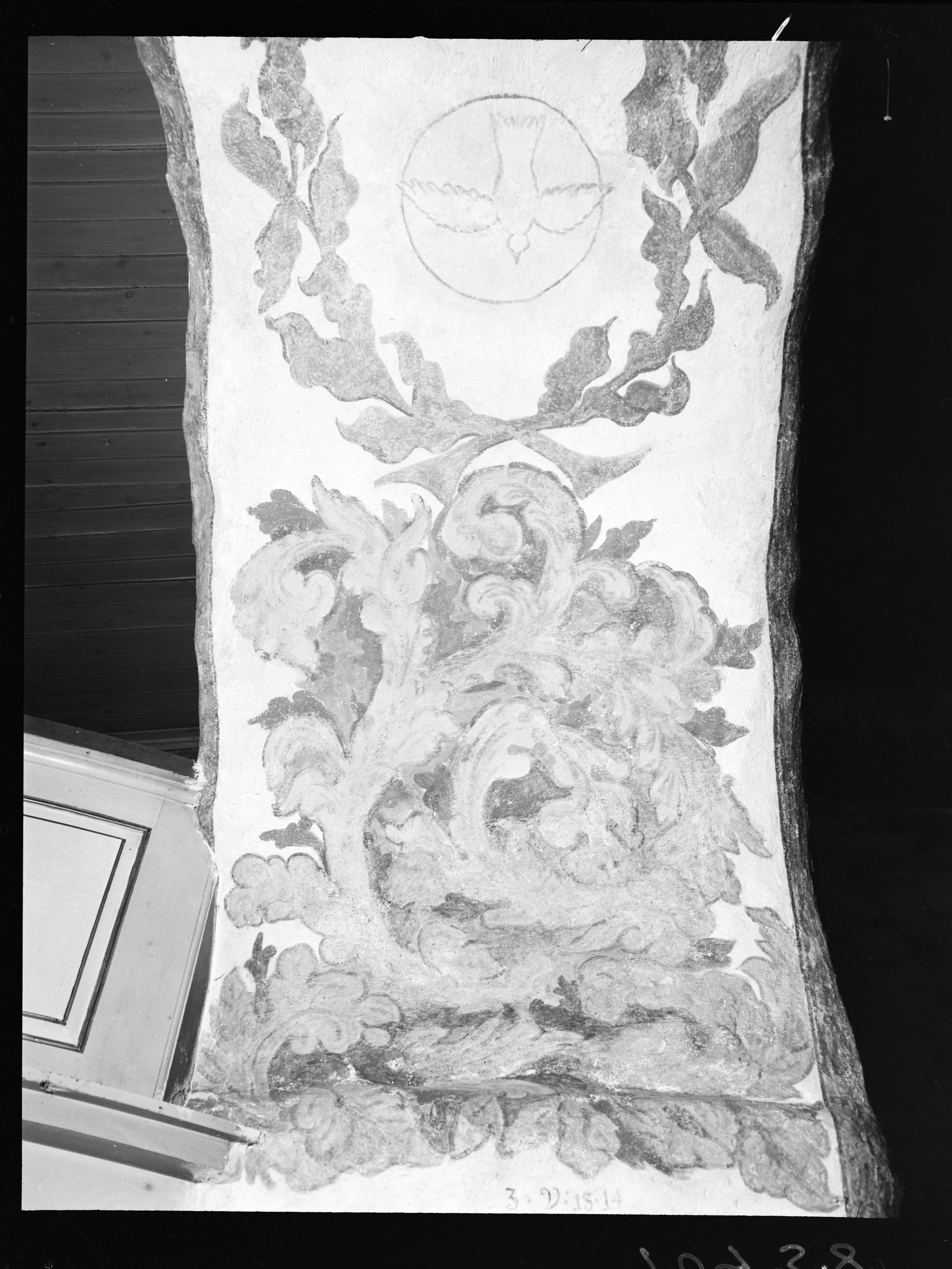

== See also ==
- List of churches in Agder og Telemark
