= Hovin =

Hovin may refer to:

== Places ==
=== Iran ===
- Hovin, Iran, a village in Chahardangeh Rural District, Hurand District, Ahar County, East Azerbaijan Province

=== Norway ===
- Hovin or Valle-Hovin, a neighborhood in the city of Oslo
- Hovin, Tinn, a village in Tinn Municipality in Telemark county
- Hovin, Trøndelag, a village in Melhus Municipality in Trøndelag county
- Hovin, Østfold, a village in Indre Østfold Municipality in Østfold county
- Hovin Municipality, a former municipality in Telemark county
- Hovin Church (Telemark), a church in Tinn municipality in Telemark county
