= Heddal Municipality =

Former municipality in Norway

Heddal Municipality Heddal herad
- Former municipality
- Hitterdal herred (historic name)
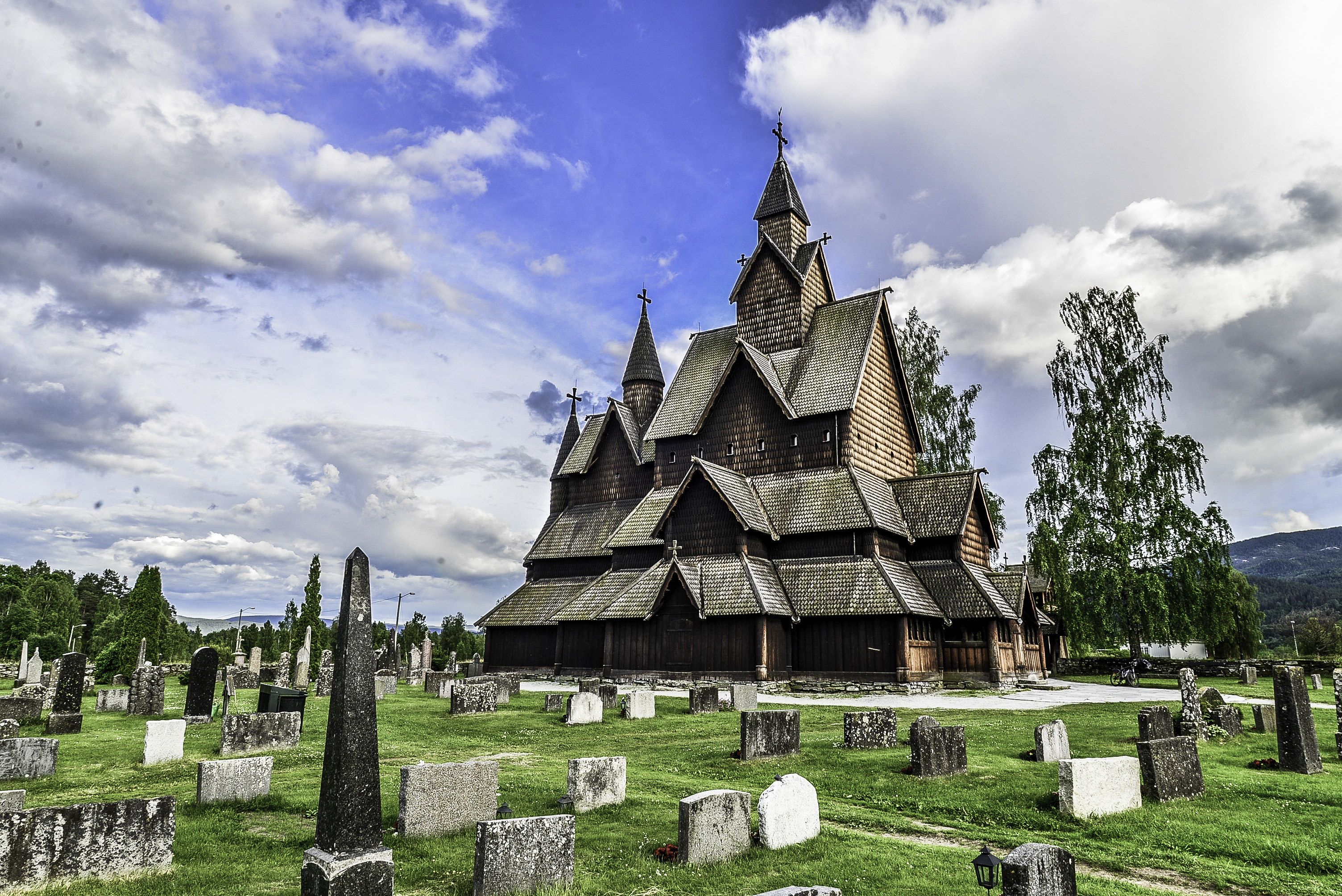
- View of the historic Heddal Stave Church

- Telemark within Norway

- Heddal within Telemark
- Coordinates: 59°35′15″N 9°10′20″E
- Country: Norway
- County: Telemark
- District: Aust-Telemark
- Established: 1 Jan 1838
  - Created as: Formannskapsdistrikt
- Disestablished: 1 Jan 1964
  - Succeeded by: Notodden Municipality
- Administrative centre: Heddal

Government
  - Mayor (1959–1963): Ole O. Småkasin (Ap)

Area (upon dissolution)
  - Total: 468.8 km^{2} (181.0 sq mi)
  - Rank: #208 in Norway
- Highest elevation: 1,289 m (4,229 ft)

Population (1963)
  - Total: 4,750
  - Rank: #189 in Norway
  - Density: 10.1/km^{2} (26/sq mi)
  - Change (10 years): ▲ +13.6%
- Demonym: Heddøl

Official language
  - Norwegian form: Nynorsk
- Time zone: UTC+01:00 (CET)
  - Summer (DST): UTC+02:00 (CEST)
- ISO 3166 code: NO-0823

Heddal (Norwegian pronunciation: [²hɛ̝d.dɐ̞ˑl]; locally [²hɛɪːtdaːɽ]) is a former municipality in Telemark county, Norway. The 468.8-square-kilometre (181.0 sq mi) municipality existed from 1838 until its dissolution in 1964. The area is now part of Notodden Municipality in the traditional district of Øvre Telemark. The administrative centre was the village of Heddal where the Heddal Stave Church.

Prior to its dissolution in 1964, the 468.8-square-kilometre (181.0 sq mi) municipality was the 208th largest by area out of the 689 municipalities in Norway. Heddal Municipality was the 189th most populous municipality in Norway with a population of about 4,750. The municipality's population density was 10.1 inhabitants per square kilometre (26/sq mi) and its population had increased by 13.6% over the previous 10-year period.

== History ==
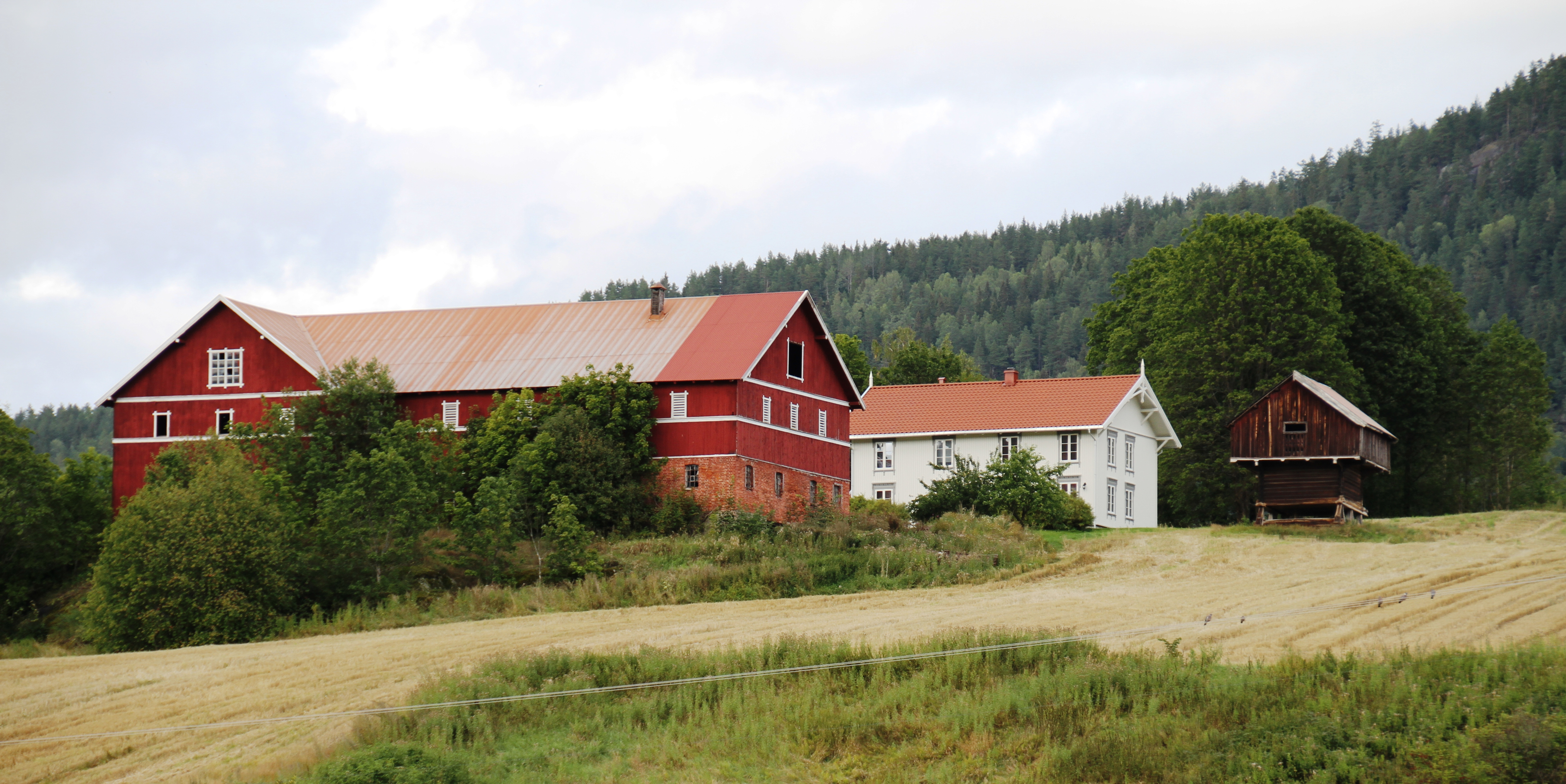
Farm area in Heddal

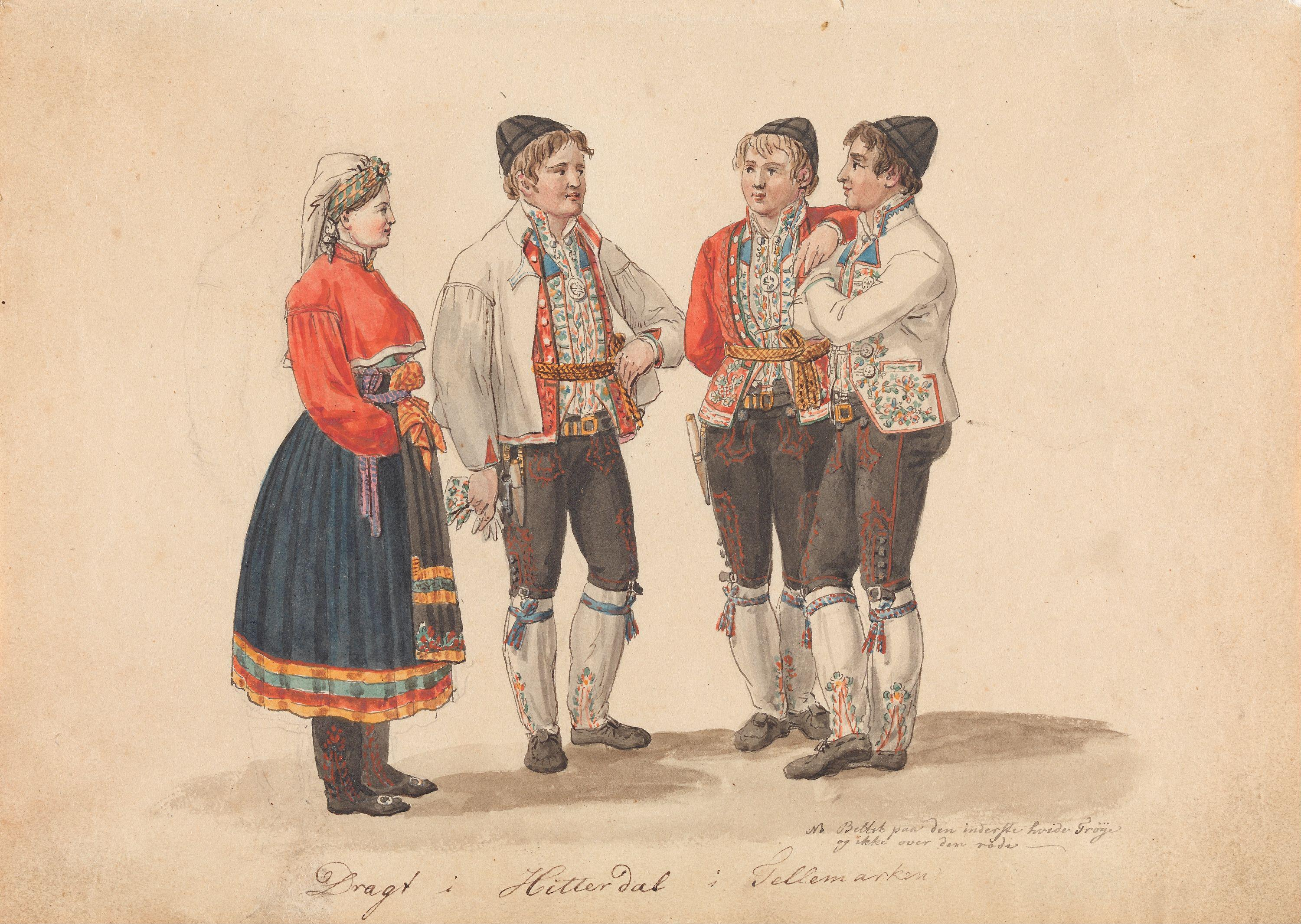
Traditional 19th century bunads from Heddal

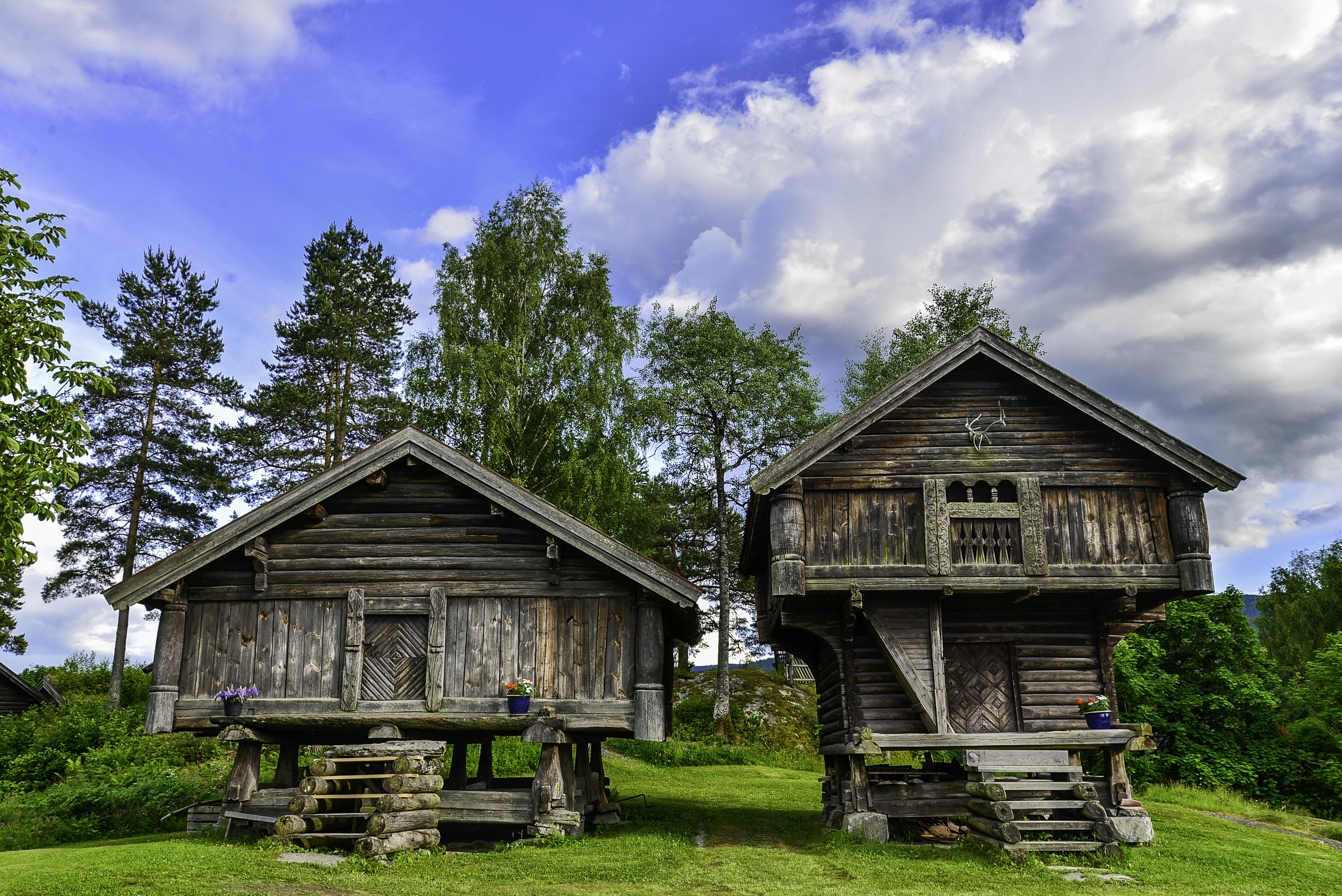
Historic farm buildings in Heddal

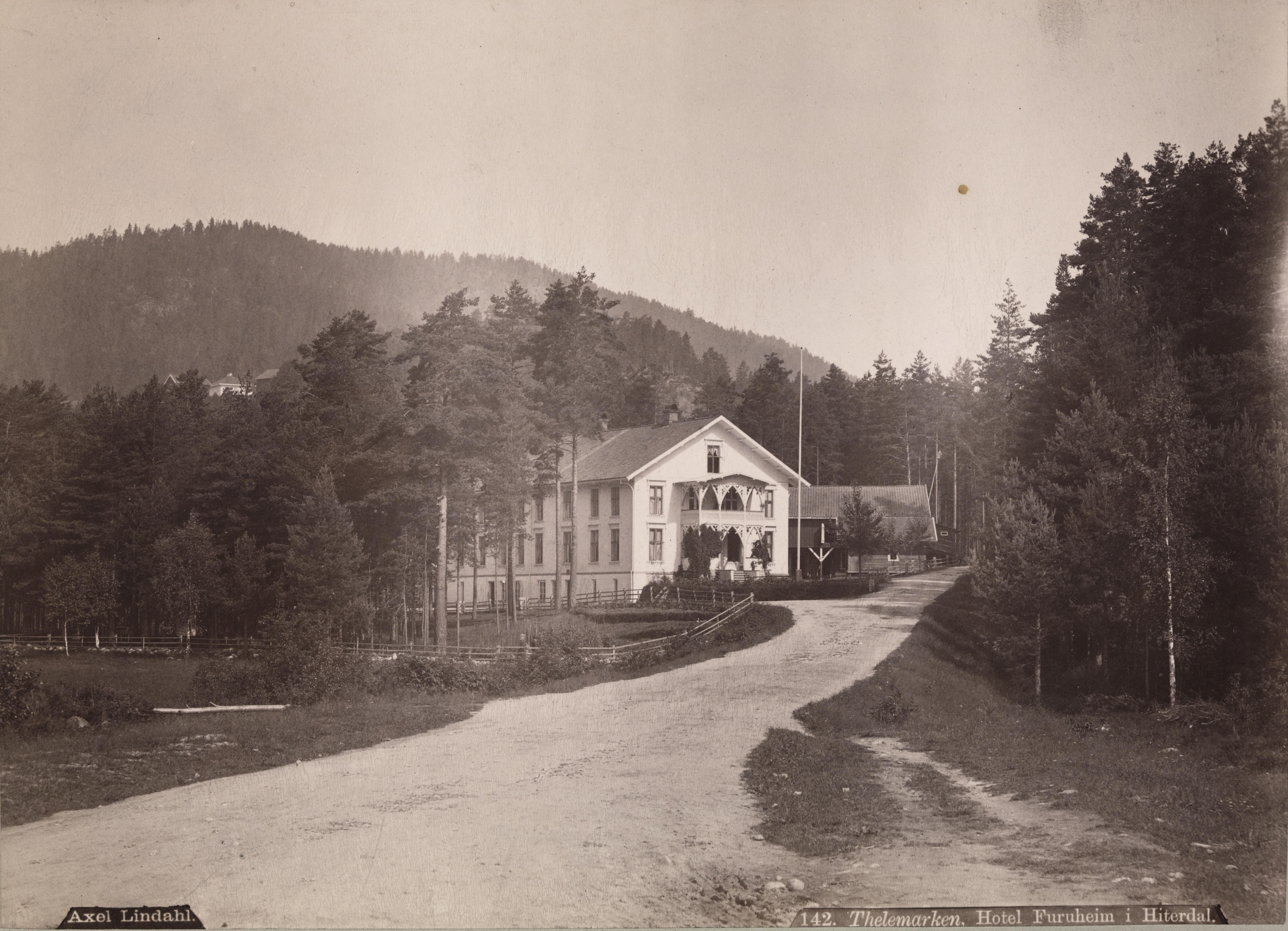
Hotel Furuheim in Heddal (c. 1885)

=== Administrative history ===
The formannskapsdistrikt law of 1837 created a system of local government in Norway by establishing each town (ladested or kjøpstad) and each Church of Norway prestegjeld as a civil municipality. On 1 January 1838, Hitterdal prestegjeld was established as Hitterdal Municipality (later spelled Heddal). The municipality originally consisted of two parishes: Hitterdal with the Hitterdal Stave Church and Lilleherred with the Lilleherred Church (the spellings of the churches and parishes have varied historically).

On 1 January 1913, the newly-designated kjøpstad (town) of Notodden (population: 4,821) was separated from Heddal Municipality to form a separate self-governing town-municipality as an enclave within Heddal Municipality. This left Heddal Municipality with 2,890 residents.

During the 1960s, there were many municipal mergers across Norway due to the work of the Schei Committee. On 1 January 1964, Heddal Municipality was dissolved and the following areas were merged to form an enlarged Notodden Municipality:

- all of Heddal Municipality (population: 4,844)
- all of Notodden Municipality (population: 7,523)
- most of Gransherad Municipality (population: 1,115), except for the upper Jondalen valley area which became part of Kongsberg Municipality in Buskerud county
- the Rudsgrendi area of Hovin Municipality (population: 21)

=== Name ===
The municipality is named after the old Heddal prestegjeld. The prestegjeld was named after the Heddalen valley (Old Norse: Heitrardalr) since the historic Heddal Stave Church was built there. The first element is derived from the old name for the local river Heddøla, a tributary of the Skien River. The old name of the river comes from the genitive case of the word heitr which has an unknown meaning. The last element is dalr which means "valley" or "dale".

Historically, the name of the municipality was spelled Hitterdal or Hiterdal. On 3 November 1917, a royal resolution changed the spelling of the name of the municipality to Heddal.

=== Churches ===
The Church of Norway had two parishes (sokn) within Heddal Municipality. At the time of the municipal dissolution, it was part of the Heddal prestegjeld and the Aust-Telemark prosti (deanery) in the Diocese of Agder.

Churches in Heddal Municipality
Parish (sokn)	Church name	Location of the church	Year built
Heddal	Heddal Stave Church	Heddal	1200s
Lisleherad	Lisleherad Church	Landsverk	1873

== Geography ==
The highest point in the municipality was the 1,289-metre (4,229 ft) tall mountain Røysdalsnuten on the western border of the municipality. Gransherad Municipality was located to the north, Øvre Sandsvær Municipality (in Buskerud county) was located to the east, Sauherad Municipality was located to the south, Bø Municipality was located to the southwest, Seljord Municipality was located to the west, and Hjartdal Municipality was located to the northwest. Notodden Municipality was located within the south-central part of Heddal Municipality as an enclave.

== Government ==
While it existed, Heddal Municipality was responsible for primary education (through 10th grade), outpatient health services, senior citizen services, welfare and other social services, zoning, economic development, and municipal roads and utilities. The municipality was governed by a municipal council of directly elected representatives. The mayor was indirectly elected by a vote of the municipal council. The municipality was under the jurisdiction of the Tinn og Heddal District Court and the Agder Court of Appeal.

=== Municipal council ===
The municipal council (Heradsstyre) of Heddal Municipality was made up of representatives that were elected to four year terms. The tables below show the historical composition of the council by political party.

Heddal heradsstyre 1959–1963
Party name (in Nynorsk)	Number of representatives
Labour Party (Arbeidarpartiet)	12
Conservative Party (Høgre)	1
Communist Party (Kommunistiske Parti)	1
Christian Democratic Party (Kristeleg Folkeparti)	2
Centre Party (Senterpartiet)	4
Liberal Party (Venstre)	1
List of workers, fishermen, and small farmholders (Arbeidarar, fiskarar, småbrukarar liste)	8
Total number of members:	29
Note: On 1 January 1964, Heddal Municipality became part of Notodden Municipality.

Heddal heradsstyre 1955–1959
Party name (in Nynorsk)	Number of representatives
Labour Party (Arbeidarpartiet)	16
Communist Party (Kommunistiske Parti)	2
Christian Democratic Party (Kristeleg Folkeparti)	3
Farmers' Party (Bondepartiet)	6
Liberal Party (Venstre)	1
List of workers, fishermen, and small farmholders (Arbeidarar, fiskarar, småbrukarar liste)	1
Total number of members:	29

Heddal heradsstyre 1951–1955
Party name (in Nynorsk)	Number of representatives
Labour Party (Arbeidarpartiet)	17
Christian Democratic Party (Kristeleg Folkeparti)	2
Farmers' Party (Bondepartiet)	5
Liberal Party (Venstre)	1
List of workers, fishermen, and small farmholders (Arbeidarar, fiskarar, småbrukarar liste)	3
Total number of members:	28

Heddal heradsstyre 1947–1951
Party name (in Nynorsk)	Number of representatives
Labour Party (Arbeidarpartiet)	18
Communist Party (Kommunistiske Parti)	3
Christian Democratic Party (Kristeleg Folkeparti)	4
Farmers' Party (Bondepartiet)	5
Liberal Party (Venstre)	1
Joint list of the Liberal Party (Venstre) and the Radical People's Party (Radikale Folkepartiet)	1
Total number of members:	32

Heddal heradsstyre 1945–1947
Party name (in Nynorsk)	Number of representatives
Labour Party (Arbeidarpartiet)	19
Communist Party (Kommunistiske Parti)	4
Christian Democratic Party (Kristeleg Folkeparti)	4
Farmers' Party (Bondepartiet)	3
Liberal Party (Venstre)	1
Joint list of the Liberal Party (Venstre) and the Radical People's Party (Radikale Folkepartiet)	1
Total number of members:	32

Heddal heradsstyre 1937–1941*
Party name (in Nynorsk)	Number of representatives
Labour Party (Arbeidarpartiet)	19
Farmers' Party (Bondepartiet)	6
Liberal Party (Venstre)	3
Joint List(s) of Non-Socialist Parties (Borgarlege Felleslister)	4
Total number of members:	40
Note: Due to the German occupation of Norway during World War II, no elections were held for new municipal councils until after the war ended in 1945.

=== Mayors ===
The mayor (Nynorsk: ordførar) of Heddal Municipality was the political leader of the municipality and the chairperson of the municipal council. The following people have held this position:

- 1838–1841: Claudius Jørgen Cloumann
- 1841–1853: Bendix Hansen Herbjørnrud
- 1853–1857: Rev. Boye Joachim Flood
- 1857–1863: Bendix Hansen Herbjørnrud
- 1863–1865: Ole Olsen Sillejord
- 1865–1869: Rev. Christen Mamen Glückstad
- 1869–1884: Mathias Mathiasen Tinne
- 1884–1891: Torkild Olsen Sauer
- 1891–1897: Ambros Olsen Hellem
- 1897–1904: Gunnuf Mathiasen Tinne
- 1904–1907: Halvor Halvorsen Gyving
- 1908–1910: Gunnuf Mathiasen Tinne
- 1911–1913: Olav Olavsen Haave
- 1914–1919: Halvor Olsen Nørstrud
- 1920–1922: Halvor Moen
- 1923–1925: Lars Sveinungsen Huristveit
- 1926–1928: Sveinung P. Simones
- 1928–1940: Gabriel Aase (Ap)
- 1941–1945: Mathias Tinne (NS)
- 1945–1946: Gabriel Aase (Ap)
- 1946–1947: Ole O. Småkasin (Ap)
- 1947–1955: Arthur Liane (Ap)
- 1955–1959: Gabriel Aase (Ap)
- 1959–1963: Ole O. Småkasin (Ap)

== Notable people ==
- Egil Bergsland (1924–2007), a Norwegian politician for the Labour Party
- Thorolf Bugge (1879–1935), a trade unionist and Norwegian politician
- Olea Crøger (1801–1855), a Folklore collector who published old folk tunes
- Sigmund Groven (born 1946), a classical harmonica player
- Hans Herbjørnsrud (1938–2023), an author of short stories.

== See also ==
- List of former municipalities of Norway
- Asteroid 15050 Heddal
- Heddal Stave Church (built after 1150)
- Heddal Open Air Museum
