= Gransherad (village) =

Village in Notodden Municipality, Norway

- Village
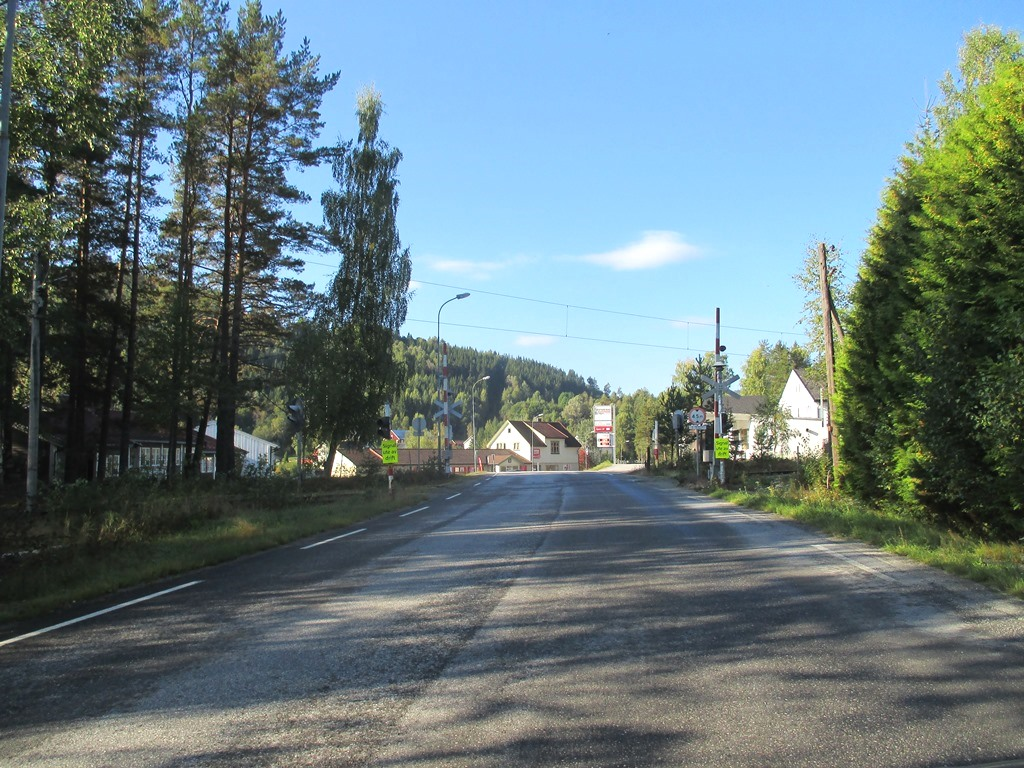
- View of the village
- Interactive map of Gransherad
- Coordinates: 59.69062°N 9.03835°E
- Country: Norway
- Region: Eastern Norway
- County: Telemark
- District: Aust-Telemark
- Municipality: Notodden Municipality
- Elevation: 183 m (600 ft)
- Time zone: UTC+01:00 (CET)
  - Summer (DST): UTC+02:00 (CEST)
- Post Code: 3691 Gransherad

Gransherad is a village in Notodden Municipality in Telemark county, Norway. The village is located along the river Tinnelva, about 4 kilometres (2.5 mi) to the south of the village of Tinnoset and the lake Tinnsjå. It sits about 17 kilometres (11 mi) to the southwest of the village of Bolkesjø, about 22 kilometres (14 mi) to the northwest of the town of Notodden, about 15 kilometres (9.3 mi) to the northwest of the village of Heddal, and about 15 kilometres (9.3 mi) to the northeast of the village of Sauland (in Hjartdal Municipality). Gransherad Church is located in the village.

== History ==
Historically, this village was the administrative centre of the old Gransherad Municipality which existed from 1860 until 1964. Prior to 1860, the village and surrounding areas were part of Hjartdal Municipality.
