= Notodden (town) =

Town in Notodden municipality, Telemark, Norway

- Town/City
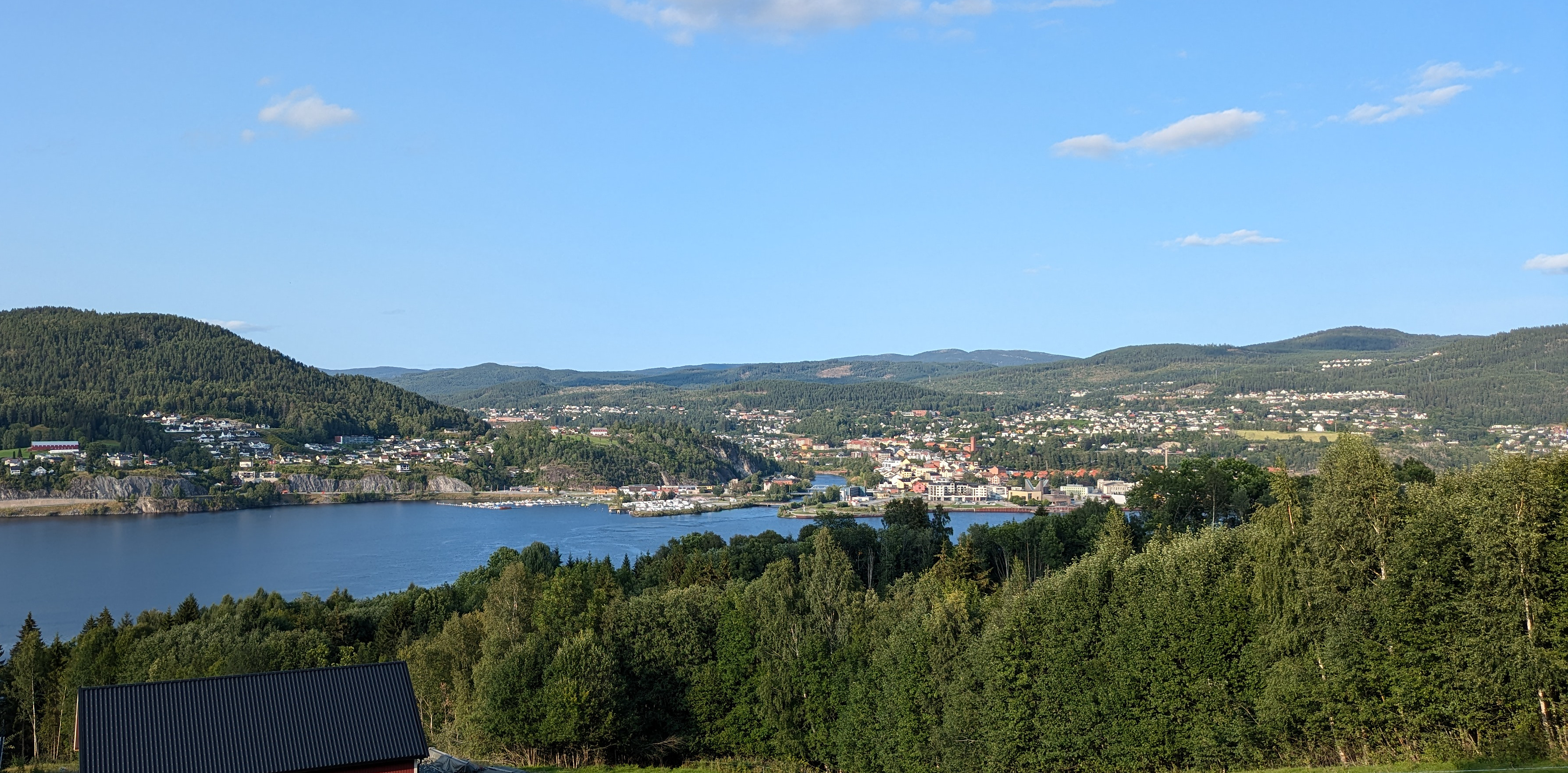
- View of the town area along the lake Heddalsvatnet
- Interactive map of Notodden
- Coordinates: 59.55935°N 9.25853°E
- Country: Norway
- Region: Eastern Norway
- County: Telemark
- District: Aust-Telemark
- Municipality: Notodden Municipality
- Established as
- Kjøpstad: 1 Jan 1913

Area
  - Total: 7.32 km^{2} (2.83 sq mi)
- Elevation: 31 m (102 ft)

Population (2025)
  - Total: 9,365
  - Density: 1,279/km^{2} (3,310/sq mi)
- Demonym: Notodding
- Time zone: UTC+01:00 (CET)
  - Summer (DST): UTC+02:00 (CEST)
- Post Code: 3681 Notodden

Notodden (Norwegian pronunciation: [ˈnuːtˌɔdːən]) is a town in Notodden Municipality in Telemark county, Norway. It is also the administrative centre of the municipality. The town is located at the north end of the lake Heddalsvatnet, at the mouth of the river Tinnelva. The villages of Heddal and Yli lie about 5 kilometres (3.1 mi) to the west of the town. The villages of Hjuksebø and Hjuksevelta both lie about 8 kilometres (5.0 mi) to the south of the town. The town of Kongsberg is located about 28 kilometres (17 mi) to the east of the town. The village of Bolkesjø is located about 20 kilometres (12 mi) to the north of the town.

The 7.32-square-kilometre (1,810-acre) town has a population (2025) of 9,365 and a population density of 1,279 inhabitants per square kilometre (3,310/sq mi).

The Notodden Church is located in the town centre. The European route E134 highway passes through the town from east to west. The town's old industrial base is located near the lake shore. This is where Norsk Hydro's facilities were built.

== History ==
The village of Notodden was established as a kjøpstad on 1 January 1913. This granted town status and special economic rights for the growing urban area. Under Norwegian law, this meant that the new town was removed from Heddal Municipality and it was given self-governing authority as Notodden Municipality. Initially, the new town had a population of 4,821 people.

During the 1960s, there were many municipal mergers across Norway due to the work of the Schei Committee. On 1 January 1964, the following areas were merged to form an enlarged Notodden Municipality:

- all of Notodden Municipality (population: 7,523)
- all of Heddal Municipality (population: 4,844)
- most of Gransherad Municipality (population: 1,115), except for the upper Jondalen valley which became part of Kongsberg Municipality in Buskerud county
- the Rudsgrendi area of Hovin Municipality (population: 21)

Before the merger, the town of Notodden made up all of Notodden Municipality, but after this merger, the municipality was greatly enlarged and since then the town has only made up a small part of the vast area of Notodden Municipality.

== Government ==
In Norway, municipalities are the unit of local government. This means that cities and towns are simply designations for urban areas, but under current Norwegian law, they have no actual government authority. The town of Notodden lies within Notodden Municipality and is therefore governed by the municipal council of Notodden Municipality.

== Gallery ==
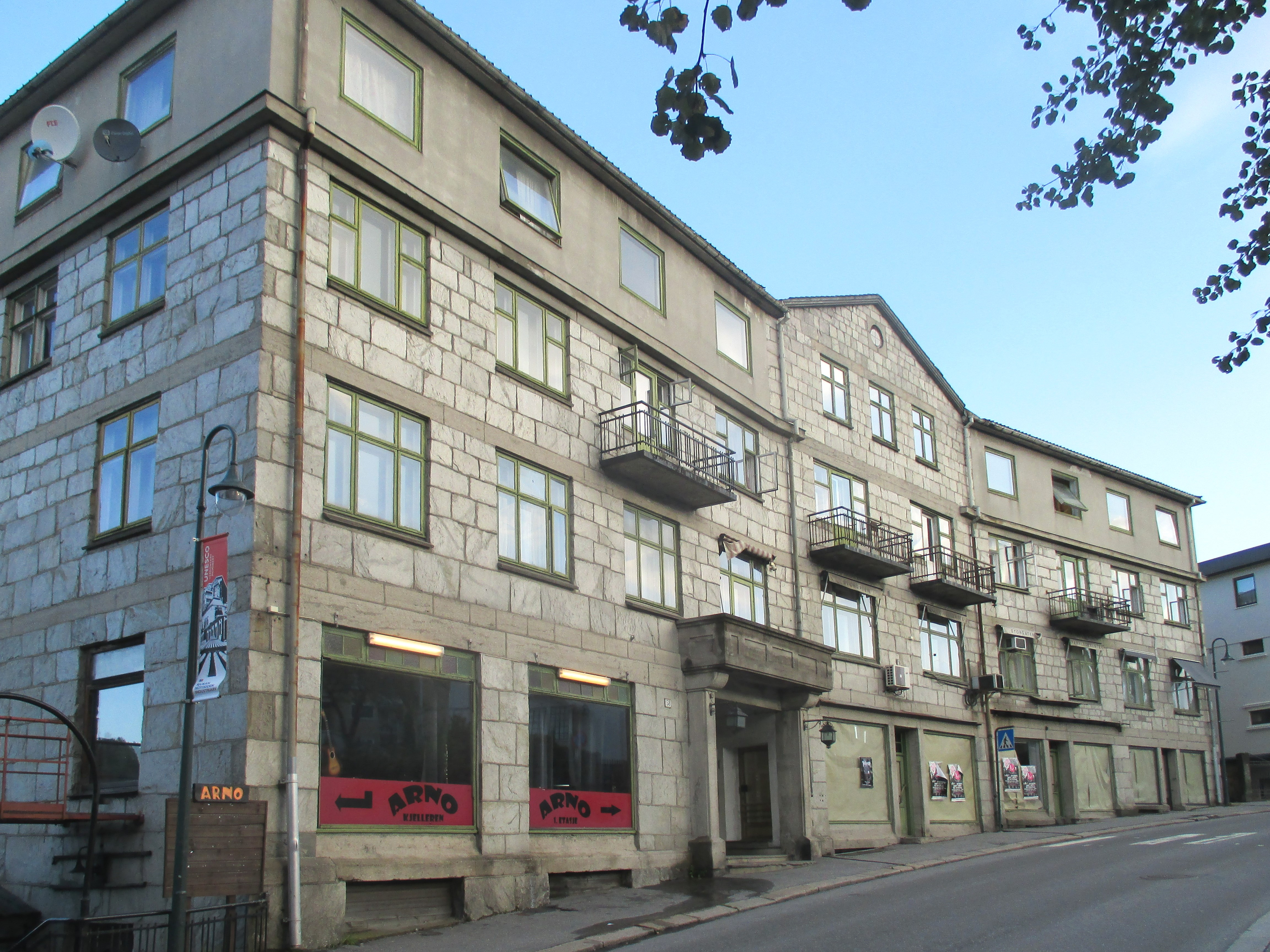

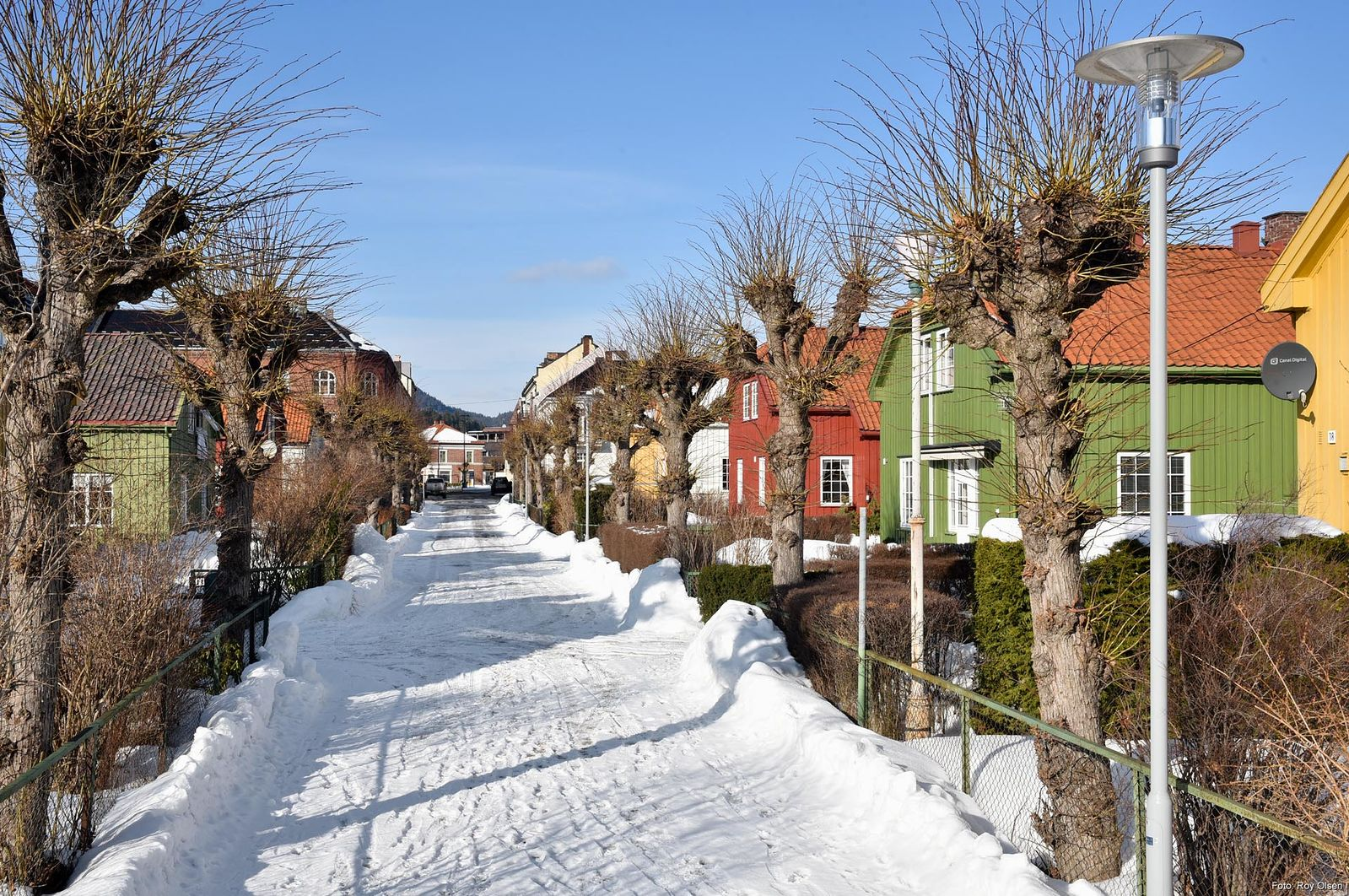

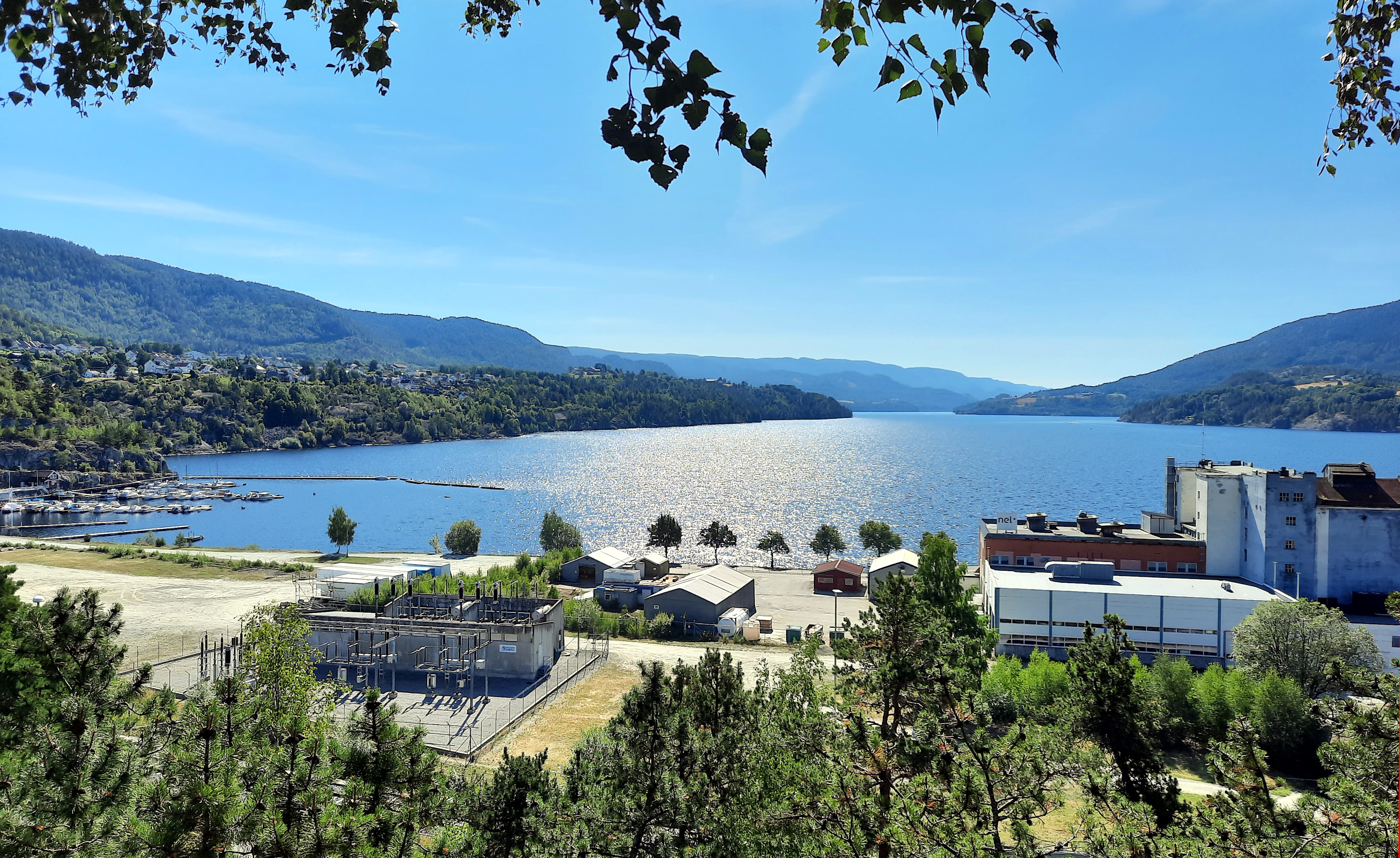

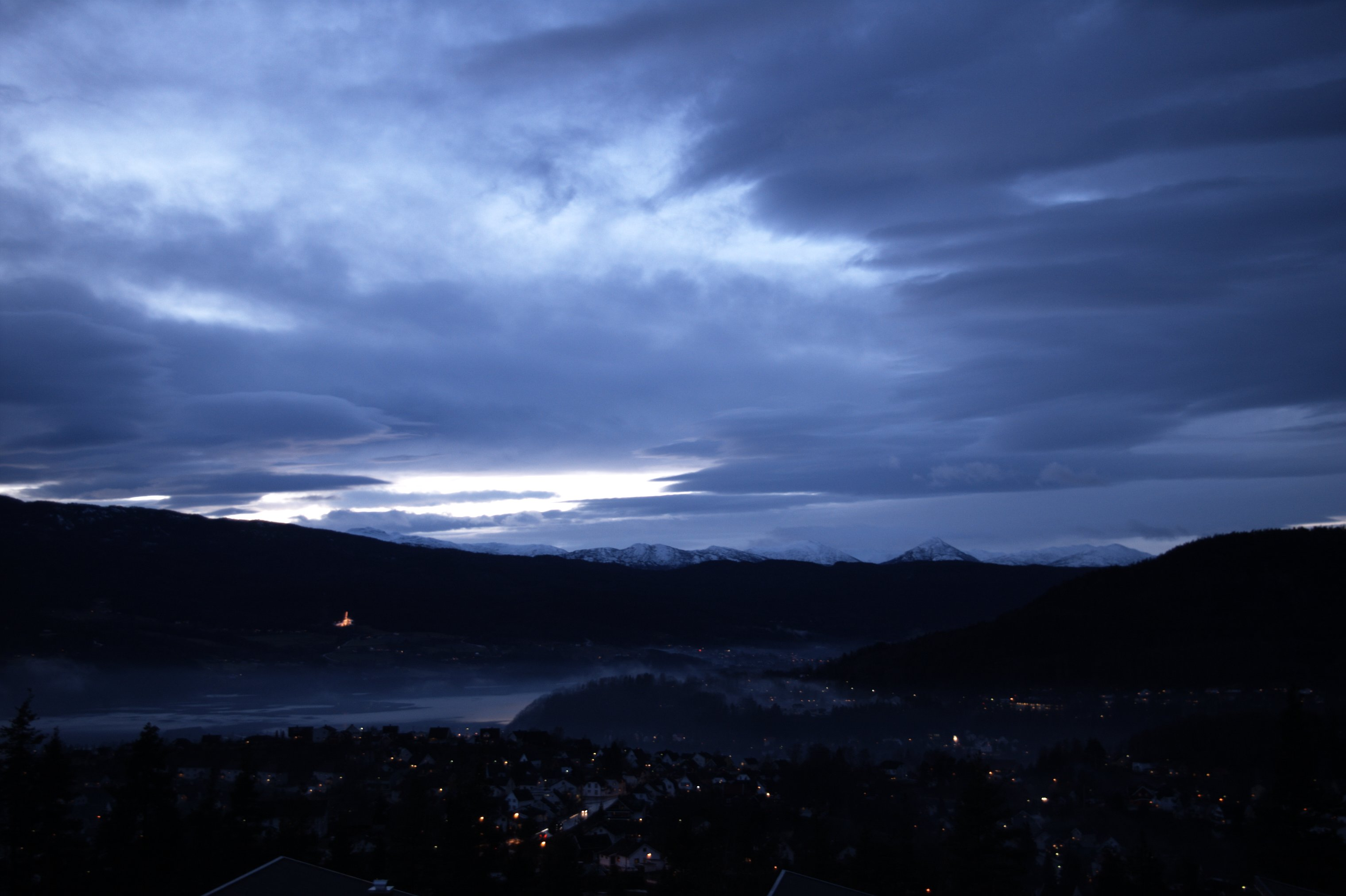

== Climate ==
Notodden has a humid continental climate (Dfb). Situated inland at low altitude in the Telemark region, it is one of the warmest places in Norway in the summer, but winters are cold. The weather station at Notodden Airport has been recording since March 1970 (temperature and wind speed). Precipitation data is from a different station in Notodden. The all-time high temperature 33.3 °C (91.9 °F) was recorded on 27 July 2018.

Climate data for Notodden Airport 1991–2020 (20 m, avg high/low 2003-2025, precipitation days 1961–90, extremes 2002–2020)
Month	Jan	Feb	Mar	Apr	May	Jun	Jul	Aug	Sep	Oct	Nov	Dec	Year
Record high °C (°F)	11.1 (52.0)	13.8 (56.8)	21.5 (70.7)	24.1 (75.4)	30.3 (86.5)	32.1 (89.8)	33.3 (91.9)	30.3 (86.5)	27.4 (81.3)	20.5 (68.9)	15.7 (60.3)	13.9 (57.0)	33.3 (91.9)
Mean daily maximum °C (°F)	−1.3 (29.7)	1.4 (34.5)	7 (45)	12.8 (55.0)	17.7 (63.9)	21.9 (71.4)	23.5 (74.3)	21.8 (71.2)	17.6 (63.7)	10.5 (50.9)	4 (39)	−0.6 (30.9)	11.4 (52.5)
Daily mean °C (°F)	−4.5 (23.9)	−3.5 (25.7)	0.5 (32.9)	5.6 (42.1)	10.8 (51.4)	14.6 (58.3)	17.1 (62.8)	15.5 (59.9)	11.2 (52.2)	4.9 (40.8)	0.6 (33.1)	−4.2 (24.4)	5.7 (42.3)
Mean daily minimum °C (°F)	−8.6 (16.5)	−7.5 (18.5)	−4 (25)	0 (32)	4.9 (40.8)	9.4 (48.9)	11.7 (53.1)	10.5 (50.9)	7.1 (44.8)	2.1 (35.8)	−2.1 (28.2)	−7 (19)	1.4 (34.5)
Record low °C (°F)	−29.7 (−21.5)	−26.4 (−15.5)	−23.5 (−10.3)	−10.8 (12.6)	−4 (25)	1 (34)	3.6 (38.5)	1.8 (35.2)	−2.9 (26.8)	−10.8 (12.6)	−17.4 (0.7)	−29.1 (−20.4)	−29.7 (−21.5)
Average precipitation mm (inches)	57 (2.2)	32 (1.3)	33 (1.3)	36 (1.4)	55 (2.2)	69 (2.7)	77 (3.0)	86 (3.4)	80 (3.1)	85 (3.3)	78 (3.1)	53 (2.1)	741 (29.1)
Average precipitation days (≥ 1.0 mm)	9	6	7	7	8	9	10	10	10	10	10	8	104
Source 1: yr.no/Norwegian Meteorological Institute
Source 2: Seklima (avg highs/lows)

== See also ==
- List of towns and cities in Norway
