= Rudsgrendi =

Village in Notodden Municipality, Norway

Rudsgrendi Rudsgrend
- Village
- Interactive map of Rudsgrendi
- Coordinates: 59.8502°N 8.94217°E
- Country: Norway
- Region: Eastern Norway
- County: Telemark
- District: Aust-Telemark
- Municipality: Notodden Municipality
- Elevation: 221 m (725 ft)
- Time zone: UTC+01:00 (CET)
  - Summer (DST): UTC+02:00 (CEST)
- Post Code: 3691 Gransherad

Rudsgrendi is a village in Notodden Municipality in Telemark county, Norway. The village is located on the western shore of the large lake Tinnsjå, halfway between the village of Gransherad and the town of Rjukan. On the opposite side of the lake lies the village of Hovin. The village of Tinnoset lies about 15 kilometres (9.3 mi) to the south.

== History ==
In the mid-nineteenth century Rudsgrendi was administratively a part of Tinn Municipality, but the area became a part of the new Gransherad Municipality in 1860. In 1886, the Rudsgrendi area was separated from Gransherad Municipality and became part of the new Hovin Municipality of its own. Rudsgrendi was part of Hovin Municipality from 1886 until 1 January 1964. Then on 1 January 1964 Hovin Municipality and Gransherad Municipality became a part of Notodden Municipality. At that time, Rudsgrendi had 21 inhabitants.
