= Telemark =

County in Eastern Norway

Telemark County Telemark fylke
- County
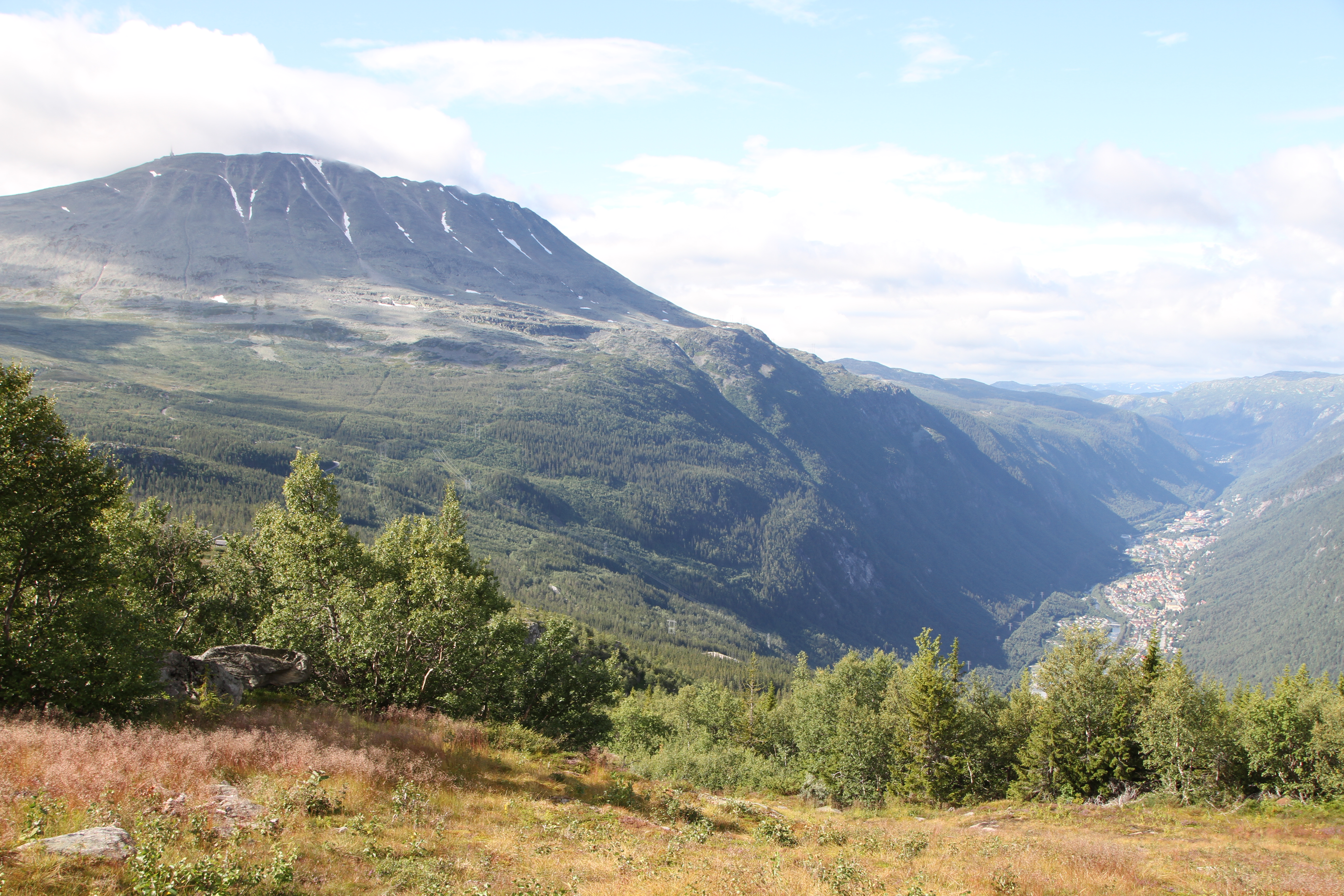
- Scenery of Rjukan and Gaustatoppen in Upper Telemark district

- Flag Coat of arms

- Telemark within Norway
- Coordinates: 59.500°N 8.700°E
- Country: Norway
- County: Telemark
- District: Østlandet
- Established: 1662
- Disestablished: 1 Jan 2020
  - Succeeded by: Vestfold og Telemark
- Re-established: 1 Jan 2024
  - Preceded by: Vestfold og Telemark
- Administrative centre: Skien

Government
  - Body: Telemark County Municipality
  - Governor: Fred-Ivar Syrstad (Ap)
  - County mayor (2023): Sven Tore Løkslid (Ap)

Area
  - Total: 15,298.2 km^{2} (5,906.7 sq mi)
  - Land: 13,832.4 km^{2} (5,340.7 sq mi)
  - Water: 1,465.7 km^{2} (565.9 sq mi) 9.6%
  - Rank: #8 in Norway

Population (2023)
  - Total: 175,546
  - Rank: #13 in Norway
  - Density: 12.7/km^{2} (33/sq mi)
  - Change (10 years): ▲ +2.7%
- Demonym(s): Teledøl; Telemarking

Official language
  - Norwegian form: Neutral
- Time zone: UTC+01:00 (CET)
  - Summer (DST): UTC+02:00 (CEST)
- ISO 3166 code: NO-40
- Income (per capita): 139,900 kr
- GDP (per capita): 219,404 kr (2001)
- GDP national rank: #12 in Norway (2.38% of country)
- Website: Official website

Telemark (pronounced [ˈtêːləmɑrk]) is a county in Norway. Telemark borders the counties of Vestfold, Buskerud, Vestland, Rogaland and Agder. In 2020, Telemark merged with the county of Vestfold to form the county of Vestfold og Telemark. On 1 January 2024, the county of Telemark was re-established after Vestfold og Telemark was divided again.

The name Telemark means the "mark of the Thelir", the ancient North Germanic tribe that inhabited what is now known as Upper Telemark in the Migration Period and the Viking Age.

In the Middle Ages, the agricultural society of Upper Telemark was considered the most violent region of Norway. Today, half of the buildings from medieval times in Norway are located here. The dialects spoken in Upper Telemark also retain more elements of Old Norse than those spoken elsewhere in the country. Upper Telemark is also known as the birthplace of skiing.

The southern part of Telemark, Grenland, is more urban and influenced by trade with the Low Countries, northern Germany, Denmark and the British Isles.

Telemark has been one of Norway's most important industrial regions for centuries, marked in particular by the Norske Skog Union paper mills in Grenland and the Norsk Hydro heavy water and fertilizer production in Upper Telemark.

Telemark county was re-established on 1 January 2024, following a vote of the county council of Vestfold og Telemark on 15 February 2022 to split the newly established county into its respective counties that existed before the merger took place; Telemark and Vestfold.

== History ==
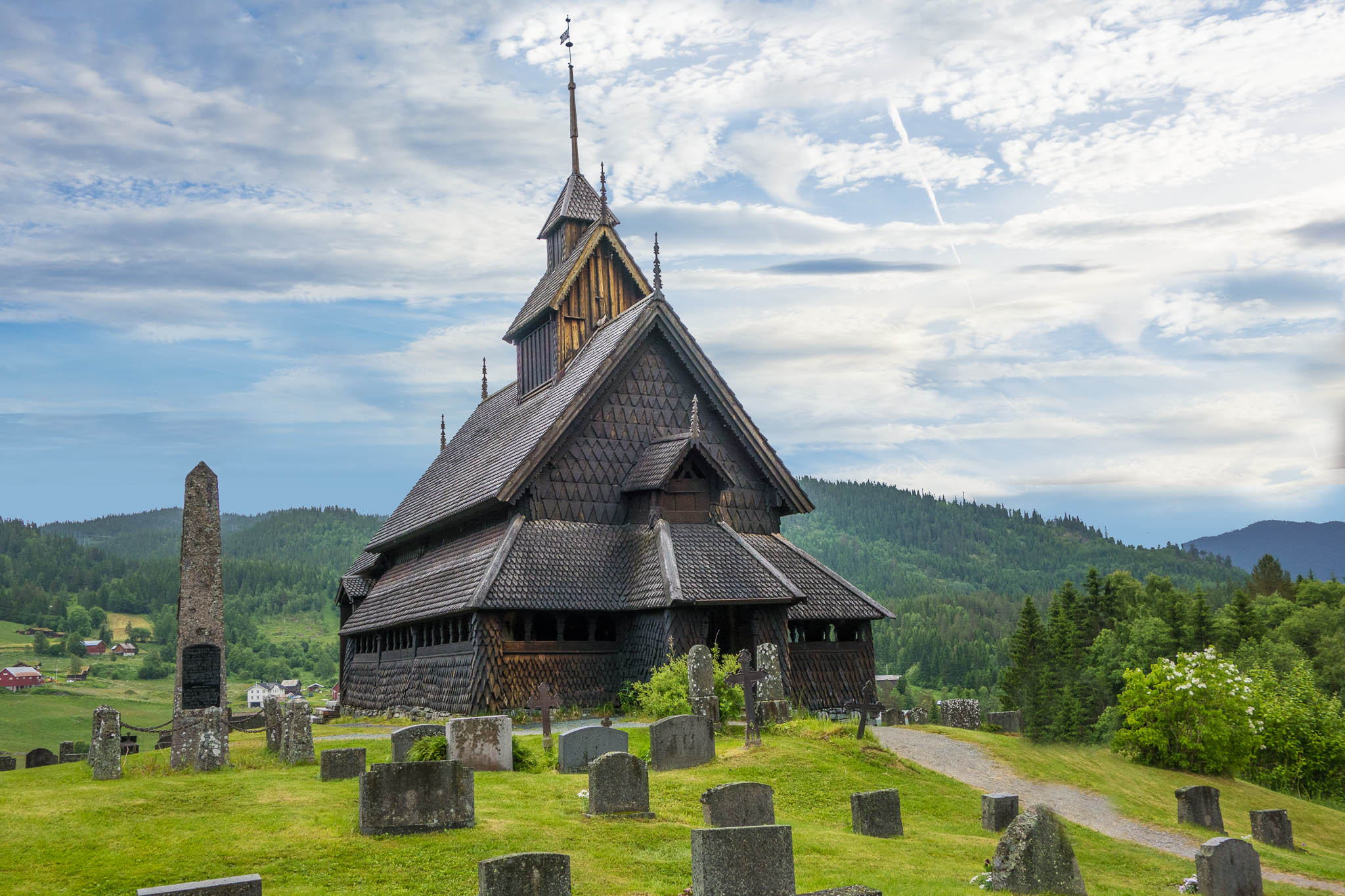
The 13th-century Eidsborg Stave Church in Tokke Municipality, Upper Telemark

Telemark county was established as the fief Bratsberg in the late Middle Ages, during Norway's union with Denmark. With the introduction of absolute monarchy in 1662 it became a county, and it was renamed Telemark in 1919 and was a county until 2020. The county administration was in the port town Skien, which was in the early modern period Norway's most important city, ahead of Christiania.

Telemark consists of several distinct historical regions. It takes its name from the largest of them, which is now called Upper Telemark, but which was historically simply called Telemark. Telemark is named for the Thelir (Þilir in Old Norse), the ancient North Germanic tribe that inhabited what is now known as Upper Telemark since the Migration Period and during the Viking Age. The Norse form of the name was Þelamǫrk. The first element is the genitive plural case of Þilir while the last element is mǫrk "woodland, borderland, march".

Traditional Telemark, i.e. Upper Telemark, is located in the inland and comprises more than two thirds of it according to its traditional definition. Both in medieval times and later (Upper) Telemark was the region of Norway with the most self-owning farmers. It retained Norse culture to a larger degree than any other region in Norway, with respect to its more egalitarian organisation of society, religion, traditional values and language. Thus the people of Telemark were often described during the Middle Ages and early modern era as the most violent in Norway. The dialects of Upper Telemark are also the dialects of Norwegian that are closest to Old Norse. The farmers of Telemark were marked by a strong-willed conservatism and belief in their traditional values that often defied the central authorities of Denmark-Norway; for example they held on to aspects of both Old Norse religion and later of Catholicism longer than other regions in Norway. (Upper) Telemark traditionally lacks cities entirely.

Grenland and the Skien fjord are flatter regions located closer to or at the coast. Historically Grenland referred to what is now called Midt-Telemark, but over time the name Grenland has come to refer to the Skien fjord area. The latter is traditionally characterized by its cities and its involvement in seafaring and trade. It also includes several larger agricultural properties and estates, as well as industry. The culture and social structure are more urban, far less traditional, more influenced by contact with continental Europe and far less egalitarian. The most important city of the region, Skien, was historically one of Norway's most important cities, although its importance declined after the Napoleonic Wars. The playwright Henrik Ibsen was a native of Skien, and many of his plays are set in places reminiscent of the city and area.

During the Dano-Norwegian union the traditional regions of Telemark and Grenland/the Skien fjord became the fief (len) and later county (amt) of Bratsberg (Bradsberg). The fief and county was named after the farm Bratsberg, since this was the seat of the governor. In 1919 Bratsberg county was renamed Telemark. Despite this, Grenland retains a separate identity that is distinct from Telemark proper; the minority in the Storting voted for the name Grenland–Telemark in 1918.

Upper Telemark, particularly Kviteseid Municipality, is known as the birthplace of skiing as a modern sport. Telemark lent its name to Telemark skiing, a style invented by Sondre Norheim, and the characteristic Telemark landing of ski jumping. Telemark is also known as the centre of the Bunad movement. Telemark has more buildings from medieval times than any other Norwegian region.

== Geography ==
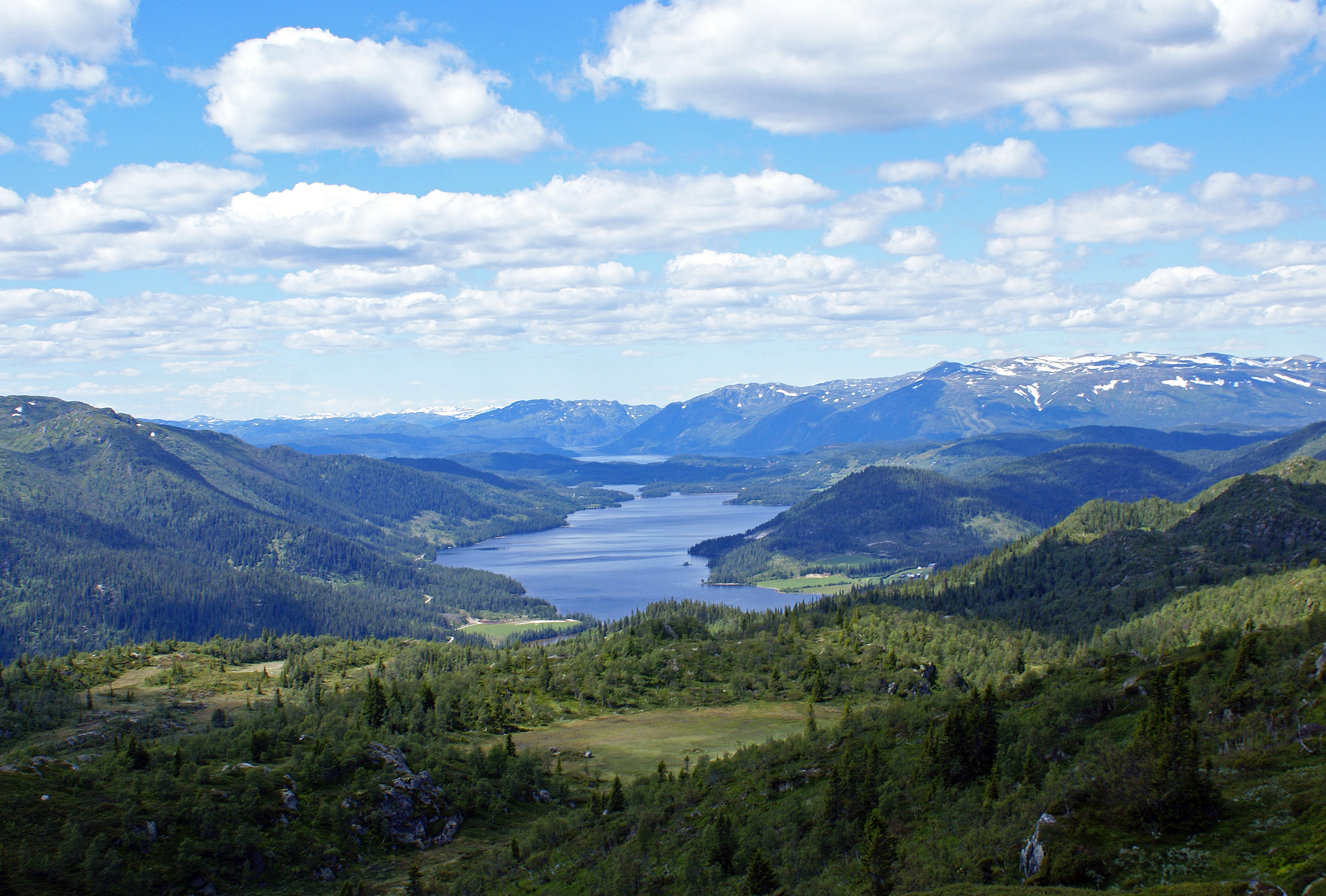
Mountain landscape in Vinje Municipality, Upper Telemark

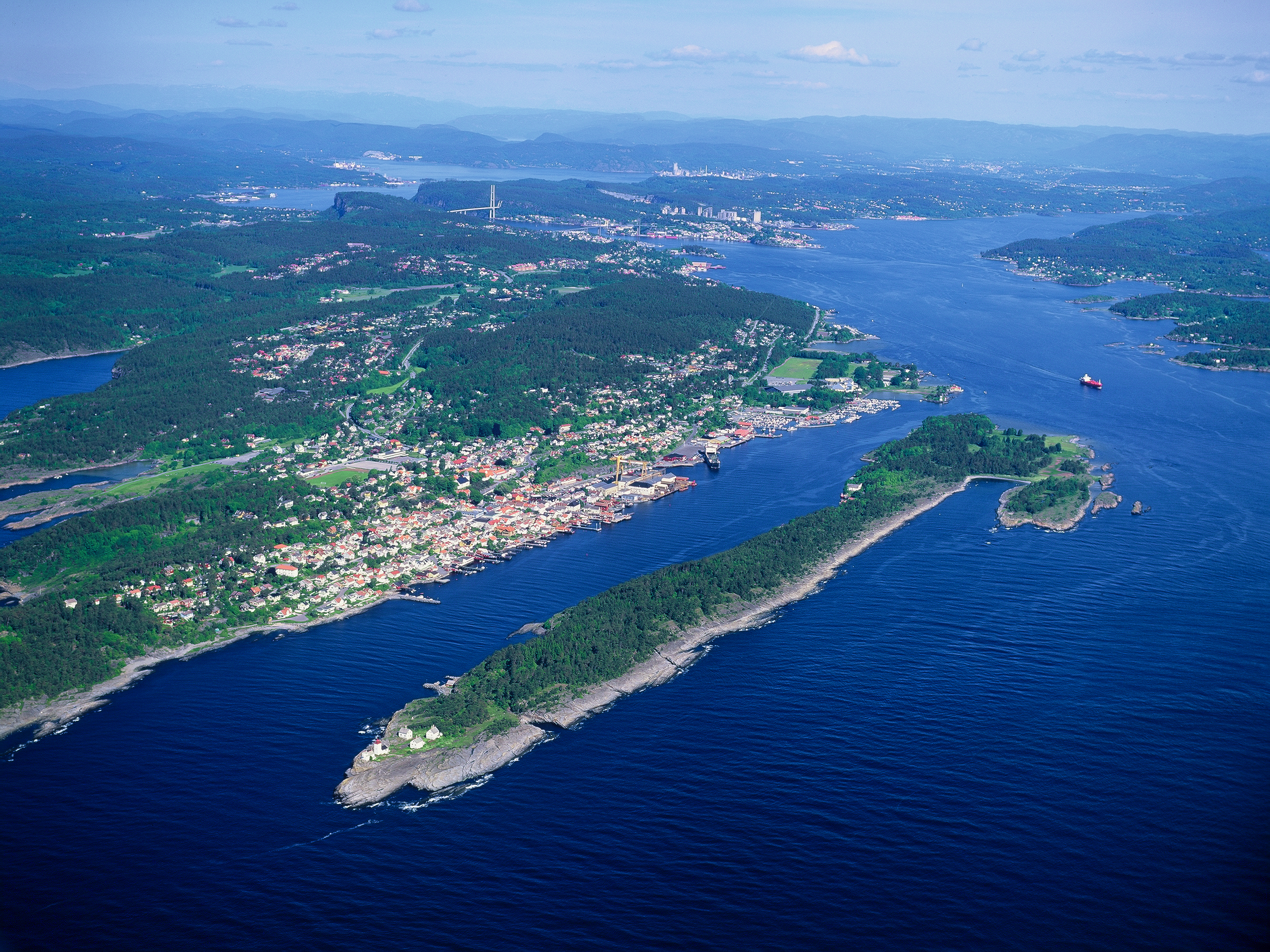
Coastal landscape in Langesund, Lower Telemark

Telemark is located in southeastern Norway, extending from the Hardangervidda mountain plateau in the North to the Skagerrak coast in the South. Telemark has a varied and scenic landscape, including a rugged coastline, valleys, lakes, hills mountains, and mountain plateaus.

Southern Telemark is the location of the Gea Norvegica UNESCO Global Geopark (UGG), established in 2006. The UGG carries significance to Norway with an abundance of larvikite along the Oslo Rift, Paleozoic fossils, geological artifacts of glacial retreat from the last glacial maximum, and rocks from the Sveconorwegian Orogeny. It is the first UGG in Scandinavia.

== Infrastructure ==
The international road E18 goes through the southern parts of Telemark, namely Grenland and Kragerø Municipality. E134, another important motorway and the fastest route between Oslo and Bergen, goes through the municipalities of Vinje, Tokke, Kviteseid, Seljord, Hjartdal, and Notodden. RV36, stretching from Porsgrunn to Seljord, links the E18 and E134 motorways.

Telemark is well served by railways. The Sørlandet Line runs through the traditional districts of Vestmar and Midt-Telemark, serving the municipalities of Drangedal, Nome, and Midt-Telemark. Grenland is primarily served by the Vestfold Line, but also has connections through the Bratsberg Line which runs between the towns of Skien and Notodden.

From Langesund, Fjordline operates ferry services to Sweden and Denmark.

The main bus lines in the region are operated by Telemark Bilruter, serving western and middle parts of the region, and Nettbuss which serves the middle, eastern and southern parts of the region. Drangedal Bilruter serves the Vestmar region.

== Population ==
Historical population
Year	Pop.	±%
1951	136,519	—
1961	149,943	+9.8%
1971	156,778	+4.6%
1981	162,050	+3.4%
1991	162,869	+0.5%
2001	165,595	+1.7%
2011	169,185	+2.2%
2020	173,355	+2.5%
Source: Statistics Norway.

Religion in Telemark
religion	percent
Christianity	86.60%
Islam	1.50%
Buddhism	0.24%
Other	11.66%

The largest population centres are Skien, Porsgrunn, Notodden, Rjukan and Kragerø. Other important places are Bø, Seljord, Fyresdal and Vinje.

== Coat of arms ==
The coat of arms of Telemark is from modern times (1970). It shows an old type of battle axe, significant for the county.

The county coat of arms valid from 1 January 2024 is a redesigned version of the county coat of arms for Telemark county from 1970 until the county merger in 2020.

== Notable telemarkinger/teledølar ==
- Myllarguten (1801–1872), legendary fiddler born in Sauherad
- Aasmund Olavsson Vinje (1818–1870), author born in Vinje
- Sondre Norheim (1825–1897), father of skiing born in Morgedal, Kviteseid
- August Cappelen (1827–1852), national romantic painter born in Skien
- Snowshoe Thompson (Jon Torsteinson-Rue) (1827–1876), American pioneer and father of California skiing
- Henrik Ibsen (1828–1906), author born in Skien
- John Anders Johnson (1832–1901), American politician
- Thorbjorn N. Mohn (1844–1899), American Lutheran church leader and first president of St. Olaf College
- Brynild Anundsen (1844–1913), founder of Decorah Posten
- Marcus Olaus Bockman (1849–1942), Norwegian-American Lutheran theologian
- Herbjørn Gausta (1854–1924), American artist. Born in Vestfjørddalen
- Theodor Kittelsen (1857–1914), artist born in Kragerø
- George Awsumb (1880–1959), architect born in Skien
- Vidkun Quisling (1887–1945), politician, collaborationist leader during World War II. Executed as a traitor, born in Fyresdal
- Aslaug Vaa (1889–1965), author born in Rauland
- Tarjei Vesaas (1897–1970), author born in Vinje
- Anne Grimdalen (1899–1961), sculptor born in Skafså, Tokke
- Eivind Groven (1901–1977), composer born in Lårdal, Tokke
- Dyre Vaa (1903–1980), sculptor born in Vinje
- Klaus Egge (1906–1979), composer born in Gransherad, Notodden
- Gunnar Sønsteby (1918–2012), war hero born in Rjukan, Tinn
- Hans Herbjørnsrud (1938–2023), author born in Heddal, Notodden Municipality
- Tor Åge Bringsværd (1939–2025), author born in Skien
- Agnes Buen Garnås (1946–2024), musician born in Jondalen
- Kåre Nordstoga (1954–), musician born in Notodden
- Bugge Wesseltoft (1964-), musician born in Porsgrunn
- Gisle Kverndokk (1967–), composer born in Skien
- Jørn Lande (1968–), hard rock / heavy metal singer born in Rjukan
- Bård Tufte Johansen (1969–), comedian born in Skien
- Odd Nordstoga (1972–), musician born in Vinje
- Frode Johnsen (1974–), footballer born in Skien
- Terje Haakonsen (1974–), snowboarder born in Vinje
- Ihsahn (Vegard Sverre Tveitan) (1975–), black/extreme metal musician born in Notodden
- Julie Bergan (1994-), Norwegian singer and songwriter born in Skien

== Districts ==
Telemark county with Upper Telemark (traditional Telemark) in red

The county is conventionally divided into traditional districts. Traditionally the county is mainly divided into Upper Telemark (historically called simply Telemark or more recently Telemark proper) and Grenland. Upper Telemark is sometimes subdivided into Vest-Telemark and Aust-Telemark. The name Lower Telemark traditionally refers to Grenland and Midt-Telemark, but was more of an administrative region than a cultural one. Regardless of definition, Upper Telemark constitutes the largest part by far. For example, the modern provostship of Upper Telemark comprises 12 municipalities and more than 80% of Telemark, also including Midt-Telemark.

An additional district, Vestmar is disputed. The district borders of this county are highly overlapping and to a certain extent undefined and/or disputed.

== Municipalities ==
Rank	Name	Inhabitants	Area km^{2}	District
1	Skien Municipality	54,942	722	Grenland
2	Porsgrunn Municipality	36,397	161	Grenland
3	Bamble Municipality	14,061	282	Grenland
4	Notodden Municipality	13,049	856	Aust-Telemark
5	Midt-Telemark Municipality	10,444	518	Midt-Telemark
6	Kragerø Municipality	10,380	289	Vestmar
7	Nome Municipality	6,515	389	Midt-Telemark
8	Tinn Municipality	5,691	1,858	Aust-Telemark
9	Drangedal Municipality	4,060	998	Vestmar
10	Vinje Municipality	3,676	2,740	Vest-Telemark
11	Seljord Municipality	2,888	672	Vest-Telemark
12	Kviteseid Municipality	2,403	626	Vest-Telemark
13	Siljan Municipality	2,340	203	Grenland
14	Tokke Municipality	2,201	907	Vest-Telemark
15	Hjartdal Municipality	1,573	741	Aust-Telemark
16	Nissedal Municipality	1,448	789	Vest-Telemark
17	Fyresdal Municipality	1,287	1,110	Vest-Telemark
Total	Telemark	173,355	13,173	

== Cities ==
- Brevik
- Kragerø
- Langesund
- Notodden
- Porsgrunn
- Rjukan
- Skien
- Stathelle

== Parishes ==
- Atrå
- Austbygdi
- Bamble
- Brevik
- Brunkeberg
- Bø
- Dal
- Drangedal
- Eidanger
- Eidsborg
- Flatdal
- Fyresdal
- Gjerpen
- Gransherad
- Grungedal
- Heddal
- Helgen
- Herre
- Hitterdal, see Heddal
- Hjartdal
- Holla (Hollen)
- Hovin
- Hægland
- Høydalsmo
- Kilebygda
- Kragerø
- Kroken, see Drangedal
- Kviteseid (Hvidesøe)
- Old Kviteseid (Hvidesøe)
- Langesund
- Lisleherad (Lilleherred)
- Lunde
- Lårdal
- Mo
- Moland
- Mæl
- Mælum
- Møsstrand
- Nes
- Nesland
- Nissedal
- Notodden
- Our Lady of Good Counsel Church, Porsgrunn
- Porsgrunn
- Rauland
- Rjukan
- Sannidal (Sannikedal)
- Saude
- Sauherad (Saude)
- Sauland
- Seljord
- Siljan
- Skafså
- Skien
- Skåtøy
- Slemdal, see Siljan
- Solum
- Stathelle
- Tinn
- Treungen
- Tuddal
- Tørdal (Tørrisdal)
- Vestre Porsgrunn
- Veum
- Vinje
- Vrådal
- Ytre Flåbygd
- Østre Porsgrunn
- Øyfjell
- Åmotsdal
- Brevik Branch (LDS, 1852–1864)
- Langesund Branch (LDS, 1852–1907)
- Skien (Frie Apostoliske, 1856–1892)
- Porsgrunn and Skien (Great Britain Consulate Birth Register, 1876–1891)
- Kragerø (Great Britain Death Register), 1895

== Villages ==
- Akkerhaugen
- Arabygdi
- Austbygde
- Bjervamoen
- Bolkesjø
- Bostrak
- Brevik
- Brunkeberg
- Bø
- Dalen
- Edland
- Eidsborg
- Eidstod
- Flatdal
- Folkestad
- Gautefall
- Gvarv
- Haukeli
- Heddal
- Helle
- Henneseid
- Herre
- Hjuksebø
- Hjuksevelta
- Holtsås
- Hoppestad
- Hovin
- Høydalsmo
- Jomfruland
- Kil
- Klovholt
- Kyrkjebygda
- Landsverk
- Langangen
- Lårdal
- Miland
- Neslandsvatn
- Nordagutu
- Portør
- Prestestranda
- Raulandsgreund
- Rudsgrendi
- Sannidal
- Sauland
- Skotfoss
- Skåtøy
- Sneltvedt
- Snurråsen
- Tinnoset
- Treungen
- Tuddal
- Tveitsund
- Tørdal
- Ulefoss
- Vadfoss
- Valebø
- Vinjesvingen
- Vrådal
- Yli
- Øyane
- Øyfjell
- Åfoss
- Åmdals Verk
- Åmotsdal

== Former municipalities ==
- Brevik Municipality
- Bø Municipality
- Eidanger Municipality
- Gjerpen Municipality
- Gransherad Municipality
- Heddal Municipality
- Holla Municipality
- Hovin Municipality
- Langesund Municipality
- Lunde Municipality
- Lårdal Municipality
- Mo Municipality
- Rauland Municipality
- Sannidal Municipality
- Sauherad Municipality
- Skåtøy Municipality
- Solum Municipality
- Stathelle Municipality
