= Gransherad Municipality =

Former municipality in Norway

Gransherad Municipality Gransherad herad
- Former municipality
- Gransherred herred (historic name); Grandsherred herred (historic name)
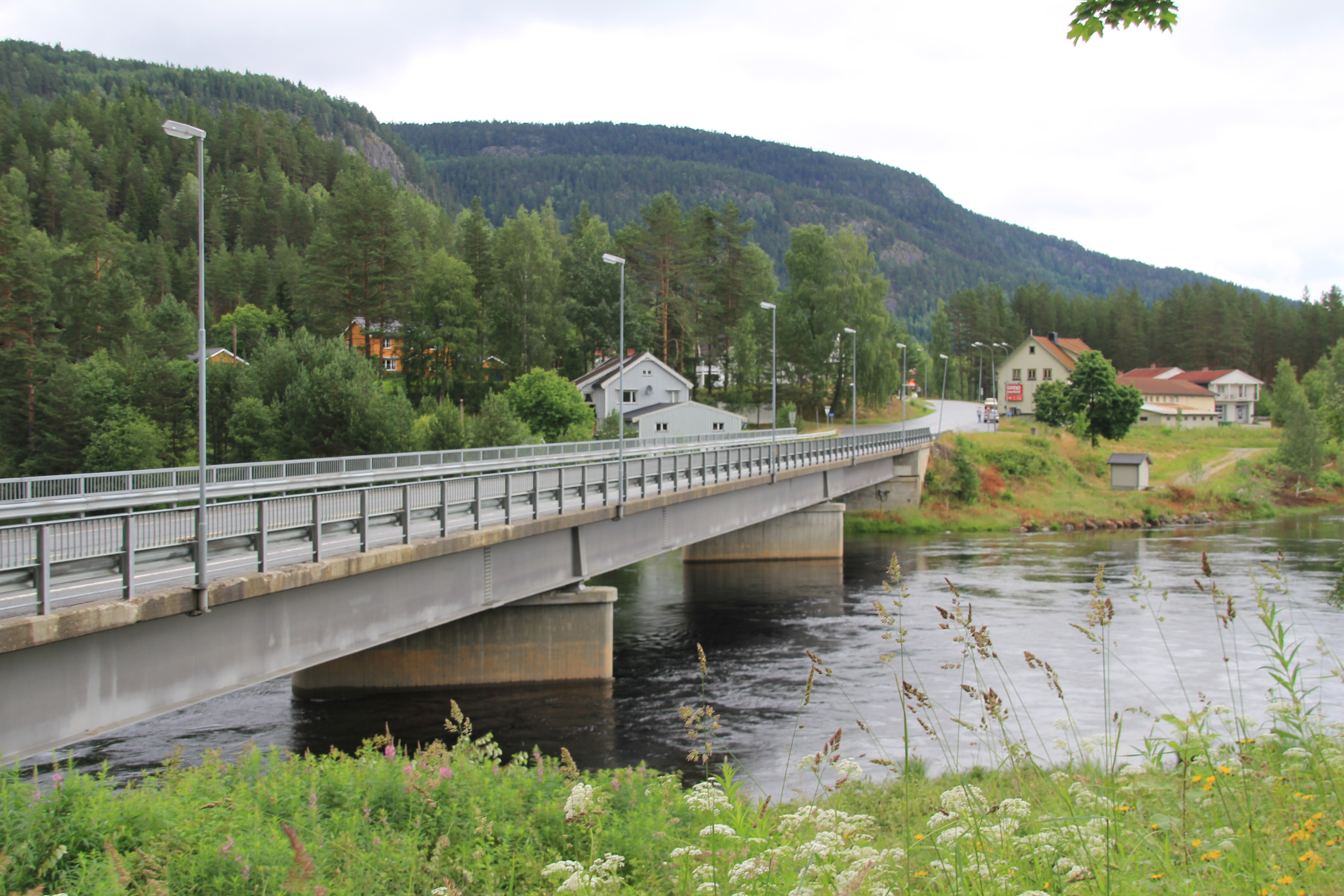
- View of the village of Gransherad

- Telemark within Norway

- Gransherad within Telemark
- Coordinates: 59°41′26″N 9°02′18″E
- Country: Norway
- County: Telemark
- District: Aust-Telemark
- Established: 1860
  - Preceded by: Hjartdal Municipality
- Disestablished: 1 Jan 1964
  - Succeeded by: Notodden Municipality
- Administrative centre: Gransherad

Government
  - Mayor (1956–1963): Helge Olsen Lillebuen (Ap)

Area (upon dissolution)
  - Total: 443.2 km^{2} (171.1 sq mi)
  - Rank: #222 in Norway
- Highest elevation: 1,306.04 m (4,284.9 ft)

Population (1963)
  - Total: 1,258
  - Rank: #573 in Norway
  - Density: 2.8/km^{2} (7.3/sq mi)
  - Change (10 years): ▼ −4.6%
- Demonym: Granshering

Official language
  - Norwegian form: Nynorsk
- Time zone: UTC+01:00 (CET)
  - Summer (DST): UTC+02:00 (CEST)
- ISO 3166 code: NO-0824

Gransherad (Norwegian pronunciation: [ˈɡɾɑ̀nːshæːɾɑ]; locally [ˈɡɾɑ̀nːshæːɽæ]) is a former municipality in Telemark county, Norway. The 443.2-square-kilometre (171.1 sq mi) municipality existed from 1860 until its dissolution in 1964. The area is now divided between Notodden Municipality (in Telemark county) and Kongsberg Municipality (in Buskerud county). It is part of the traditional district of Øvre Telemark. The administrative centre was the village of Gransherad where Gransherad Church is located.

Prior to its dissolution in 1964, the 443.2-square-kilometre (171.1 sq mi) municipality was the 222nd largest by area out of the 689 municipalities in Norway. Gransherad Municipality was the 573rd most populous municipality in Norway with a population of about 1,258. The municipality's population density was 2.8 inhabitants per square kilometre (7.3/sq mi) and its population had decreased by 4.6% over the previous 10-year period.

== General information ==
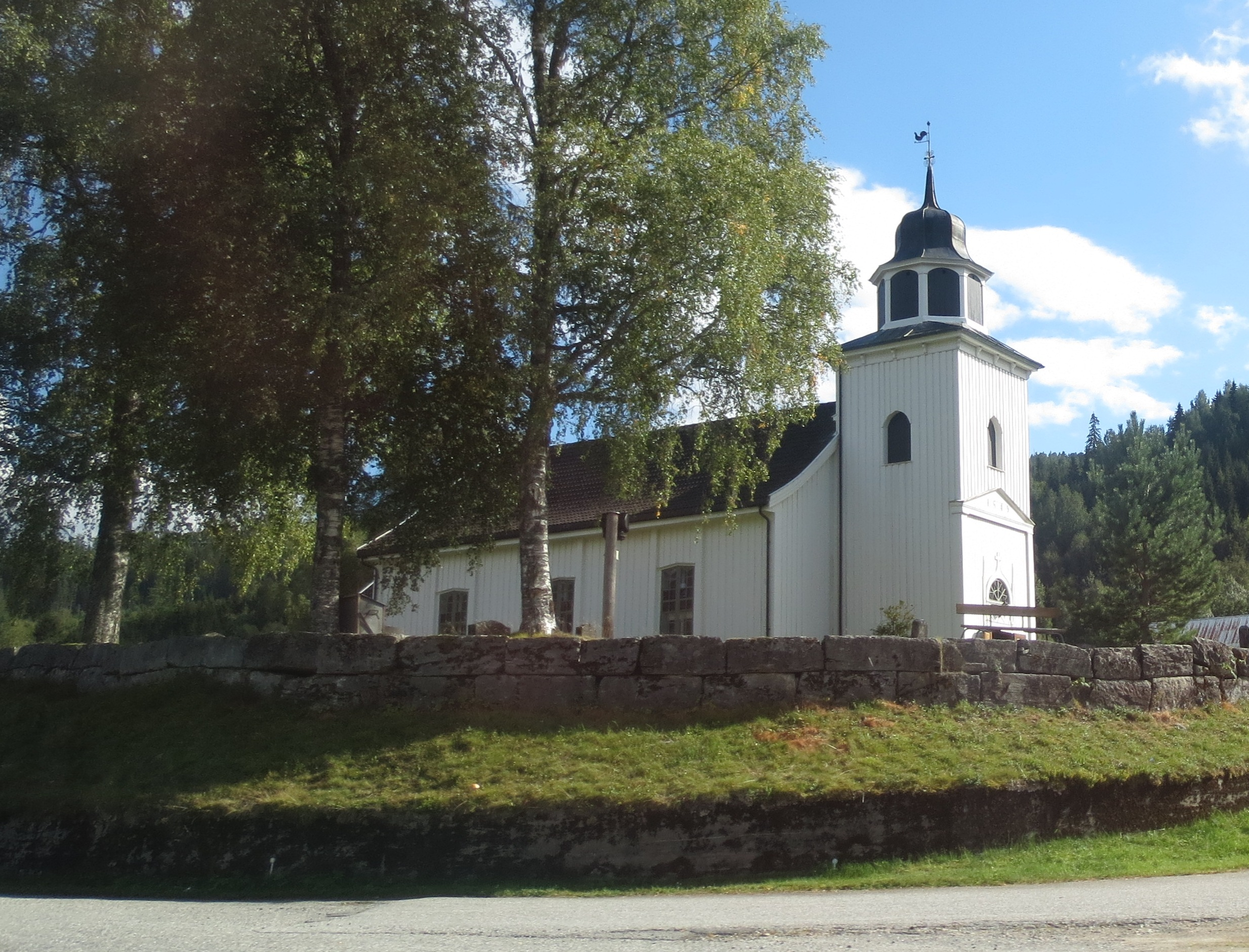
Gransherad Church

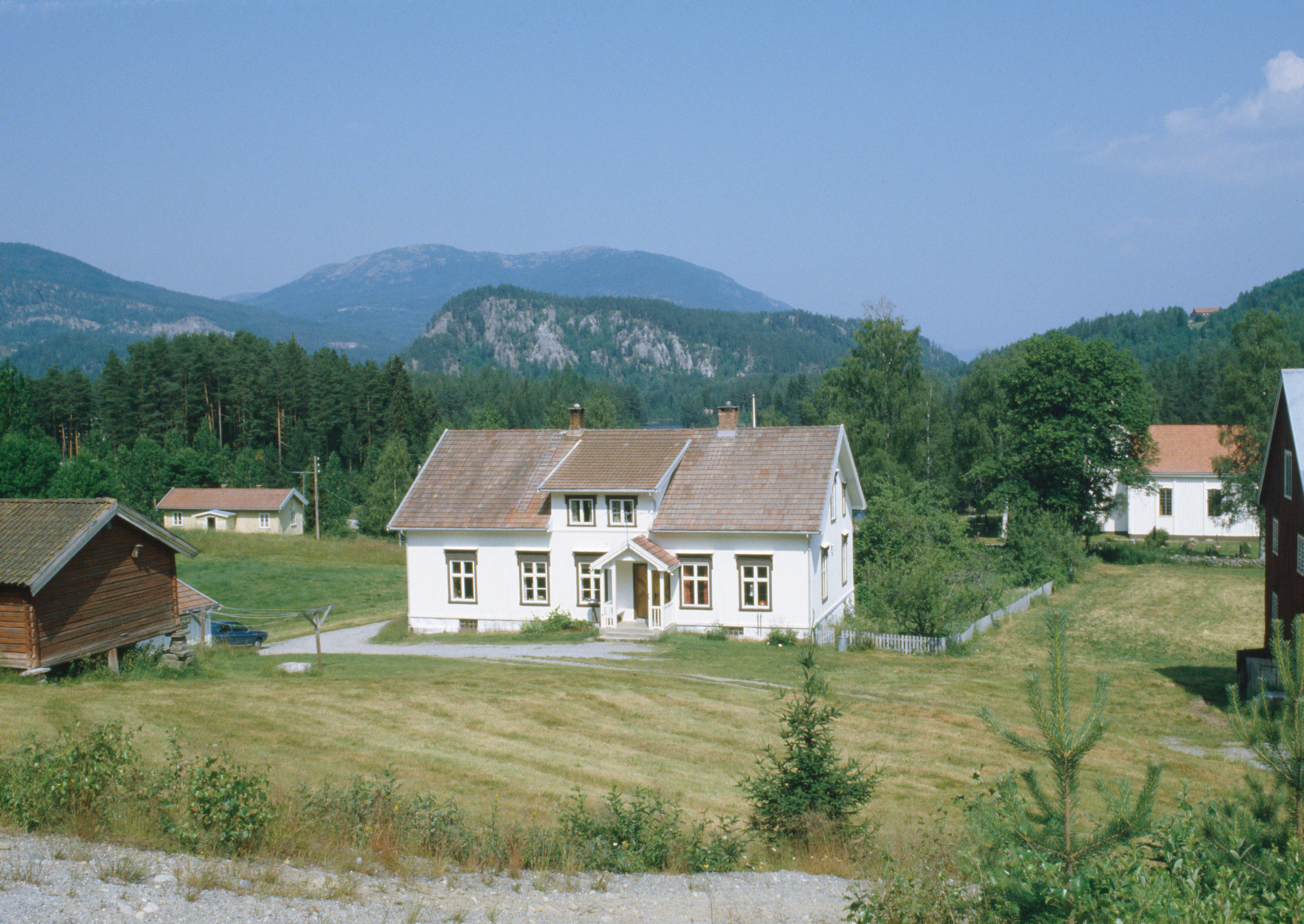
Farm in Gransherad

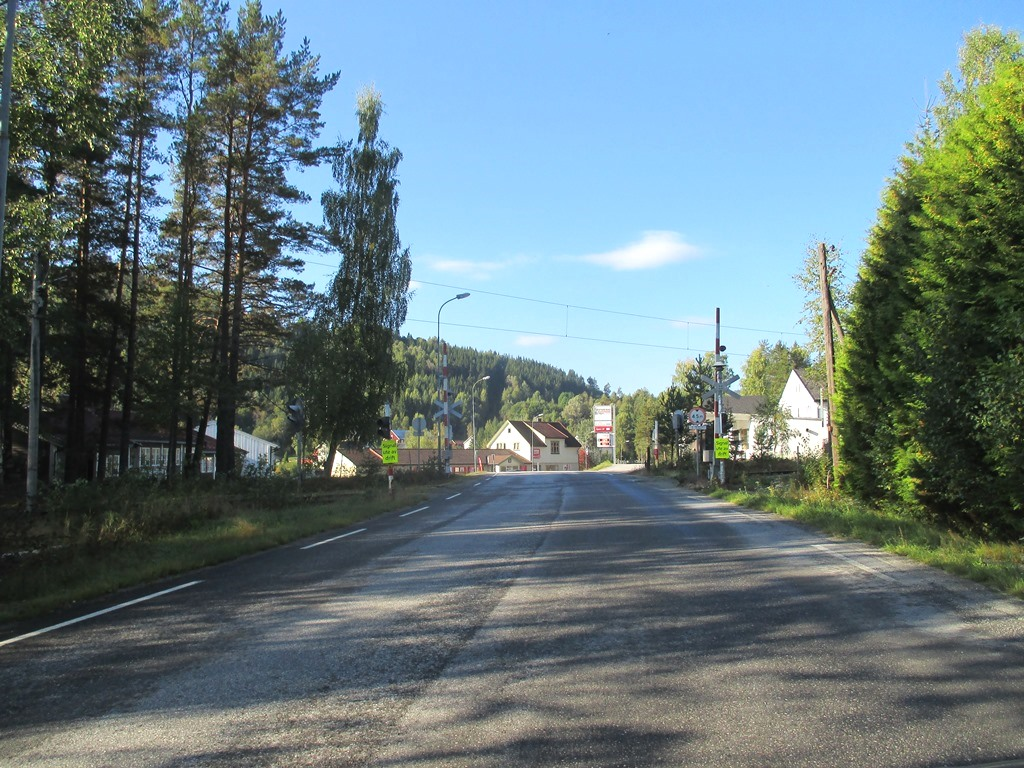
View of the village of Gransherad

=== Administrative history ===
The municipality of Grandsherred (later spelled Gransherad) was established in 1860 when the following areas were merged to form the new municipality:

- the Hovin parish from southeastern Tinn Municipality (population: 815)
- the Grandsherred parish from eastern Hjartdal Municipality (population: 1,310)

On 1 January 1886, the growing Gransherad Municipality was divided based on its "old" borders as follows: the northern district (population: 885) became the new Hovin Municipality and the southern district (population: 1,393) continued as a smaller Gransherad Municipality.

During the 1960s, there were many municipal mergers across Norway due to the work of the Schei Committee. On 1 January 1964, the upper Jondalen valley area (population: 132) in eastern Gransherad Municipality was transferred to the neighboring Kongsberg Municipality (in Buskerud county). On the same date, the rest of Gransherad Municipality was dissolved and the following areas were merged to form an enlarged Notodden Municipality:

- the rest of Gransherad Municipality (population: 1,115)
- all of Heddal Municipality (population: 4,844)
- all of Notodden Municipality (population: 7,523)
- the Rudsgrendi area of Hovin Municipality (population: 21)

=== Name ===
The municipality and historic Church of Norway parish (sokn) was named after an old name for the area (Old Norse: Grandalsherað). The first element of the genitive case of the name Grandalr, an old name for a local valley and/or farm area. The first part of this is derived from the word grǫn which means "spruce" and the last part of this is identical to the word dalr which means "valley" or "dale".The last element of the word is herað which means "rural district".

Historically, the name of the municipality was spelled Gransherred. In 1867, the spelling was changed to Grandsherred. This was short-lived, however, because in 1888, the spelling was changed back to Gransherred. On 3 November 1917, a royal resolution changed the spelling of the name of the municipality to Gransherad, using the Nynorsk spelling instead of the Bokmål spelling.

=== Churches ===
The Church of Norway had one parish (sokn) within Gransherad Municipality. At the time of the municipal dissolution, it was part of the Gransherad prestegjeld and the Aust-Telemark prosti (deanery) in the Diocese of Agder.

Churches in Gransherad Municipality
Parish (sokn)	Church name	Location of the church	Year built
Gransherad	Gransherad Church	Gransherad	1849

== Geography ==
The highest point in the municipality was the 1,306.04-metre (4,284.9 ft) tall mountain Bledalsrinden, just southeast of the border with Hovin Municipality. Hovin Municipality was located to the north, Flesberg Municipality (in Buskerud county) was located to the east, Øvre Sandsvær Municipality (also in Buskerud county) was located to the southeast, Heddal Municipality was located to the south, and Hjartdal Municipality was located to the west.

== Government ==
While it existed, Gransherad Municipality was responsible for primary education (through 10th grade), outpatient health services, senior citizen services, welfare and other social services, zoning, economic development, and municipal roads and utilities. The municipality was governed by a municipal council of directly elected representatives. The mayor was indirectly elected by a vote of the municipal council. The municipality was under the jurisdiction of the Tinn og Heddal District Court and the Agder Court of Appeal.

=== Municipal council ===
The municipal council (Heradsstyre) of Gransherad Municipality was made up of representatives that were elected to four year terms. The tables below show the historical composition of the council by political party.

Gransherad heradsstyre 1959–1963
Party name (in Nynorsk)	Number of representatives
Labour Party (Arbeidarpartiet)	14
Joint List(s) of Non-Socialist Parties (Borgarlege Felleslister)	7
Total number of members:	21
Note: On 1 January 1964, Gransherad Municipality became part of Notodden Municipality.

Gransherad heradsstyre 1955–1959
Party name (in Nynorsk)	Number of representatives
Labour Party (Arbeidarpartiet)	13
Joint List(s) of Non-Socialist Parties (Borgarlege Felleslister)	8
Total number of members:	21

Gransherad heradsstyre 1951–1955
Party name (in Nynorsk)	Number of representatives
Labour Party (Arbeidarpartiet)	13
Joint List(s) of Non-Socialist Parties (Borgarlege Felleslister)	7
Total number of members:	20

Gransherad heradsstyre 1947–1951
Party name (in Nynorsk)	Number of representatives
Labour Party (Arbeidarpartiet)	11
Communist Party (Kommunistiske Parti)	2
Joint List(s) of Non-Socialist Parties (Borgarlege Felleslister)	7
Total number of members:	20

Gransherad heradsstyre 1945–1947
Party name (in Nynorsk)	Number of representatives
Labour Party (Arbeidarpartiet)	11
Communist Party (Kommunistiske Parti)	3
Farmers' Party (Bondepartiet)	3
Joint list of the Liberal Party (Venstre) and the Radical People's Party (Radikale Folkepartiet)	3
Total number of members:	20

Gransherad heradsstyre 1937–1941*
Party name (in Nynorsk)	Number of representatives
Labour Party (Arbeidarpartiet)	11
Joint List(s) of Non-Socialist Parties (Borgarlege Felleslister)	9
Total number of members:	20
Note: Due to the German occupation of Norway during World War II, no elections were held for new municipal councils until after the war ended in 1945.

=== Mayors ===
The mayor (Nynorsk: ordførar) of Gransherad Municipality was the political leader of the municipality and the chairperson of the municipal council. The following people have held this position:

- 1860–1861: Ole Rolefsen Brekke
- 1861–1867: Gjermund Svendsen Graver
- 1867–1883: Gunleik Høljesen Hafsten
- 1884–1885: Hølje Torjussen Kopsland
- 1886–1893: Hølje Johnsen Folsland
- 1894–1897: Helge Helgesen Jore
- 1898–1901: Hølje Helgesen Bøen
- 1902–1911: Hølje Johnsen Folsland
- 1911–1919: Halvor Taraldsen Busnes
- 1920–1932: Ketil Steinarsen Kvaale
- 1932–1934: Abraham H. Tefre (Bp)
- 1935–1940: Ketil Hansen Tjønnås (Ap)
- 1941–1945: Torgrim Oskasin (NS)
- 1945–1947: Ketil Hansen Tjønnås (Ap)
- 1948–1956: Olav Hansen Aamot (Ap)
- 1956–1963: Helge Olsen Lillebuen (Ap)

== Notable people ==
- Klaus Egge, a composer who was born in Gransherad

== See also ==
- List of former municipalities of Norway
