= Hovin, Tinn =

Village in Tinn Municipality, Norway

Hovin
- Village
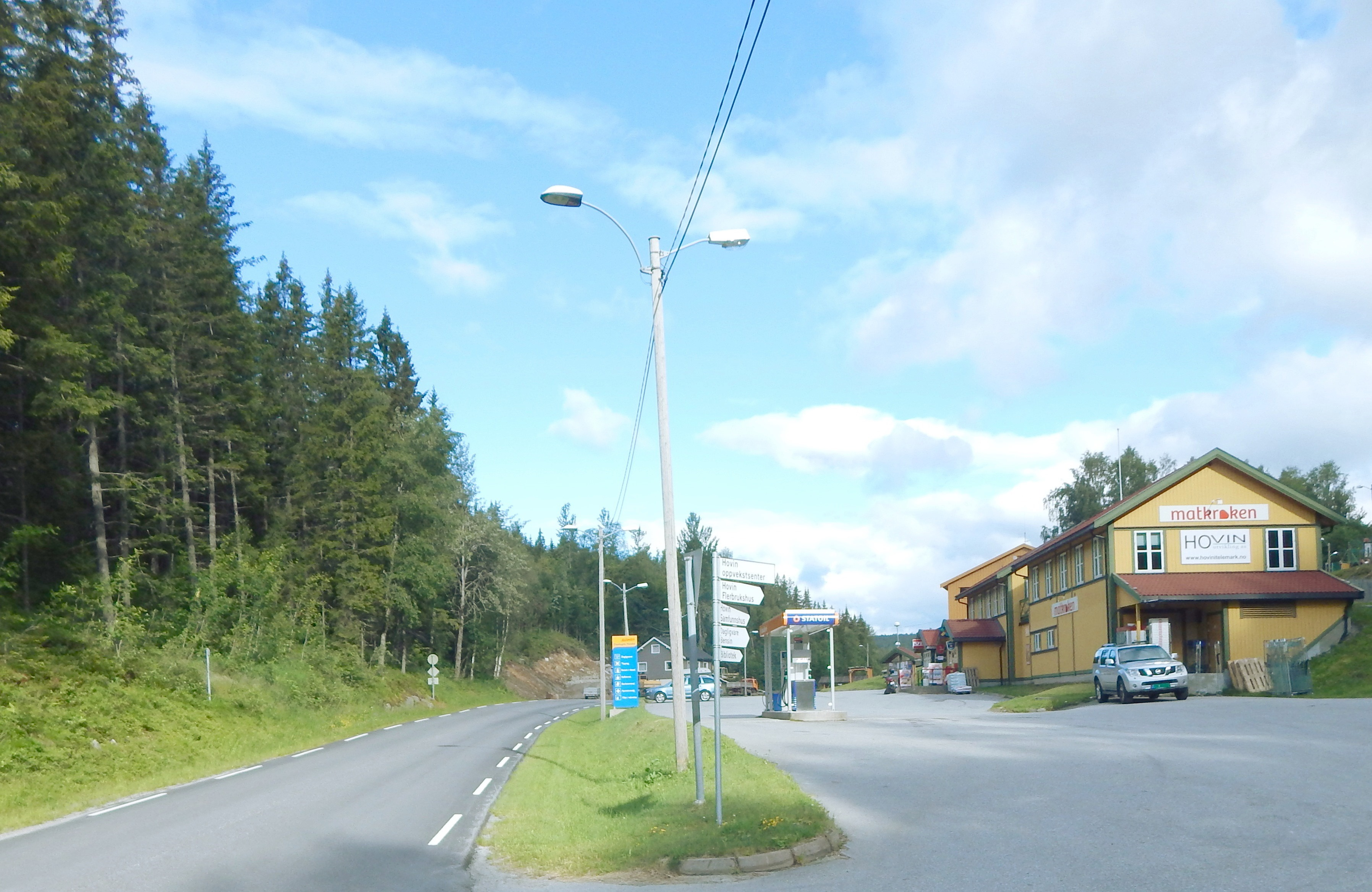
- View of the village
- Interactive map of Hovin
- Coordinates: 59.85245°N 9.02861°E
- Country: Norway
- Region: Eastern Norway
- County: Telemark
- District: Aust-Telemark
- Municipality: Tinn Municipality
- Elevation: 411 m (1,348 ft)
- Time zone: UTC+01:00 (CET)
  - Summer (DST): UTC+02:00 (CEST)
- Post Code: 3652 Hovin i Telemark

Hovin is a village in Tinn Municipality in Telemark county, Norway. The village is located just up the hill from the eastern shore of the large lake Tinnsjå. It is located about 22 kilometres (14 mi) south of the village of Austbygde and about 35 kilometres (22 mi) north of the town of Notodden. Hovin Church is located in this village.

== History ==
From 1886 until 1964, the village was the administrative centre of the old Hovin Municipality. In 1964, the municipality was dissolved and this area became part of Tinn Municipality.
