= Hovin Municipality =

Former municipality in Telemark, Norway

Hovin Municipality Hovin herad
- Former municipality
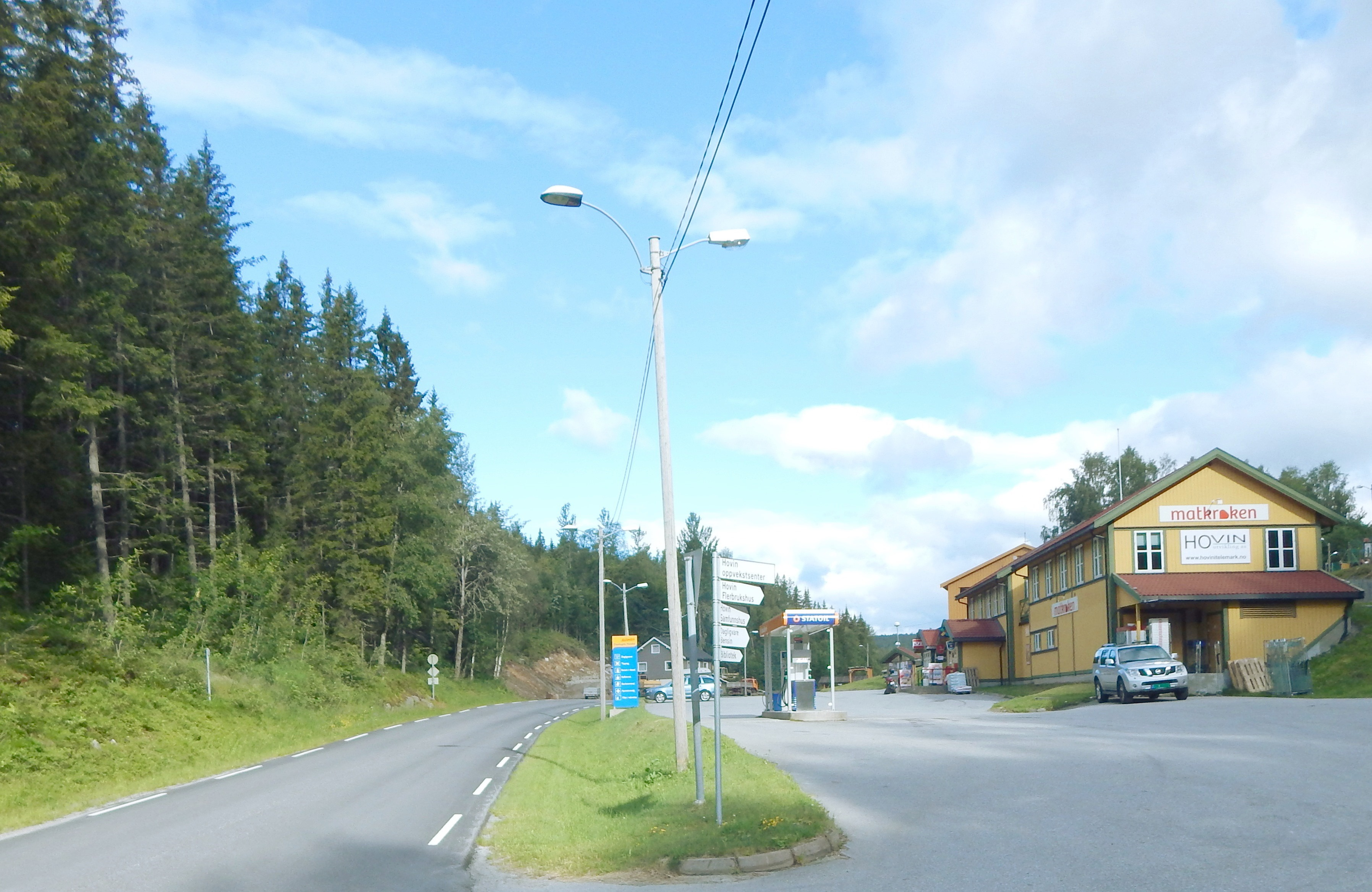
- View of Hovin

- Telemark within Norway

- Hovin within Telemark
- Coordinates: 59°51′09″N 9°01′43″E
- Country: Norway
- County: Telemark
- District: Aust-Telemark
- Established: 1 Jan 1886
  - Preceded by: Gransherad Municipality
- Disestablished: 1 Jan 1964
  - Succeeded by: Tinn Municipality and Notodden Municipality
- Administrative centre: Hovin

Government
  - Mayor (1957–1963): Halvor O. Rue (Ap)

Area (upon dissolution)
  - Total: 308 km^{2} (119 sq mi)
  - Rank: #279 in Norway
- Highest elevation: 1,342 m (4,403 ft)

Population (1963)
  - Total: 482
  - Rank: #681 in Norway
  - Density: 1.6/km^{2} (4.1/sq mi)
  - Change (10 years): ▼ −24.7%
- Demonym: Hoværing

Official language
  - Norwegian form: Nynorsk
- Time zone: UTC+01:00 (CET)
  - Summer (DST): UTC+02:00 (CEST)
- ISO 3166 code: NO-0825

Hovin (Norwegian pronunciation: [ˈhûːvɪn]; locally [ˈuːvɪn]) is a former municipality in Telemark county, Norway. The 308-square-kilometre (119 sq mi) municipality existed from 1886 until its dissolution in 1964. The area is now divided between of Tinn Municipality and Notodden Municipality in the traditional district of Øvre Telemark. The administrative centre was the village of Hovin. The other main village in the municipality was Rudsgrendi on the opposite side of the lake Tinnsjå.

Prior to its dissolution in 1964, the 308-square-kilometre (119 sq mi) municipality was the 279th largest by area out of the 689 municipalities in Norway. Hovin Municipality was the 681st most populous municipality in Norway with a population of about 482. The municipality's population density was 1.6 inhabitants per square kilometre (4.1/sq mi) and its population had decreased by 24.7% over the previous 10-year period.

== General information ==
=== Administrative history ===
The municipality of Hovin was established on 1 January 1886 when Gransherad Municipality was divided into two: the northern district (population: 885) became the new Hovin Municipality and the southern district (population: 1,393) continued as a smaller Gransherad Municipality. On 24 March 1903, an unpopulated part of Tinn Municipality was transferred to Hovin Municipality.

During the 1960s, there were many municipal mergers across Norway due to the work of the Schei Committee. On 1 January 1964, Hovin Municipality was dissolved and its lands were split up between the neighboring Notodden Municipality and Tinn Municipality.

The following areas were merged to form an enlarged Notodden Municipality on 1 January 1964:

- all of Notodden Municipality (population: 7,523)
- all of Heddal Municipality (population: 4,844)
- most of Gransherad Municipality (population: 1,115), except for the Øvre Jondalen area which became part of Kongsberg Municipality in Buskerud county
- the Rudsgrendi area on the west side of the lake Tinnsjå of Hovin Municipality (population: 21)

The following areas were merged to form an enlarged Tinn Municipality on 1 January 1964:

- all of Tinn Municipality (population: 9,449)
- most of Hovin Municipality (population: 461), except for the Rudsgrendi area which became part of Notodden Municipality

=== Name ===
The municipality and historic Church of Norway parish (sokn) was named after the old Hovin farm (Old Norse: Hofvin) since the first Hovin Church was built there. The first element is identical to the word hof which means "heathen hof" or a "temple for the Norse gods". The last element is vin which means "meadow" or "pasture". In this context, "Hovin" likely refers to a meadow location that was associated with a pagan temple or a religious site in the past.

=== Churches ===
The Church of Norway had one parish (sokn) within Hovin Municipality. At the time of the municipal dissolution, it was part of the Gransherad prestegjeld and the Aust-Telemark prosti (deanery) in the Diocese of Agder.

Churches in Hovin Municipality
| Parish (sokn) | Church name | Location of the church | Year built |
|---|---|---|---|
| Hovin | Hovin Church | Hovin | 1850 |

== Geography ==
The large lake Tinnsjå runs through the central part of the municipality on a north-south axis. The highest point in the municipality was the 1,342-metre (4,403 ft) tall mountain Store Ble. Rollag Municipality (in Buskerud county) was located to the north, Flesberg Municipality (also in Buskerud) was located to the east, Gransherad Municipality was located to the south, Hjartdal Municipality was located to the west, and Tinn Municipality was located to the northwest.

== Government ==
While it existed, Hovin Municipality was responsible for primary education (through 10th grade), outpatient health services, senior citizen services, welfare and other social services, zoning, economic development, and municipal roads and utilities. The municipality was governed by a municipal council of directly elected representatives. The mayor was indirectly elected by a vote of the municipal council. The municipality was under the jurisdiction of the Tinn og Heddal District Court and the Agder Court of Appeal.

=== Municipal council ===
The municipal council (Heradsstyre) of Hovin Municipality was made up of 17 representatives that were elected to four year terms. The tables below show the historical composition of the council by political party.

Hovin heradsstyre 1959–1963
| Party name (in Nynorsk) | Number of representatives |
|---|---|
| Labour Party (Arbeidarpartiet) | 9 |
| Centre Party (Senterpartiet) | 6 |
| Liberal Party (Venstre) | 2 |
| Total number of members: | 17 |
Note: On 1 January 1964, Hovin Municipality was divided between Notodden Municipality and Tinn Municipality.

Hovin heradsstyre 1955–1959
| Party name (in Nynorsk) | Number of representatives |
|---|---|
| Labour Party (Arbeidarpartiet) | 9 |
| Farmers' Party (Bondepartiet) | 6 |
| Liberal Party (Venstre) | 2 |
| Total number of members: | 17 |

Hovin heradsstyre 1951–1955
| Party name (in Nynorsk) | Number of representatives |
|---|---|
| Labour Party (Arbeidarpartiet) | 8 |
| Joint List(s) of Non-Socialist Parties (Borgarlege Felleslister) | 8 |
| Total number of members: | 16 |

Hovin heradsstyre 1947–1951
| Party name (in Nynorsk) | Number of representatives |
|---|---|
| Labour Party (Arbeidarpartiet) | 9 |
| Farmers' Party (Bondepartiet) | 4 |
| Joint list of the Liberal Party (Venstre) and the Radical People's Party (Radikale Folkepartiet) | 3 |
| Total number of members: | 16 |

Hovin heradsstyre 1945–1947
| Party name (in Nynorsk) | Number of representatives |
|---|---|
| Labour Party (Arbeidarpartiet) | 8 |
| Farmers' Party (Bondepartiet) | 4 |
| Joint list of the Liberal Party (Venstre) and the Radical People's Party (Radikale Folkepartiet) | 4 |
| Total number of members: | 16 |

Hovin heradsstyre 1937–1941*
| Party name (in Nynorsk) | Number of representatives |
|---|---|
| Labour Party (Arbeidarpartiet) | 7 |
| Farmers' Party (Bondepartiet) | 5 |
| Liberal Party (Venstre) | 4 |
| Total number of members: | 16 |
Note: Due to the German occupation of Norway during World War II, no elections were held for new municipal councils until after the war ended in 1945.

=== Mayors ===
The mayor (Nynorsk: ordførar) of Hovin Municipality was the political leader of the municipality and the chairperson of the municipal council. The following people have held this position:

- 1886–1889: John Johnsen Rue
- 1890–1891: Svend Gjermundsen Graver
- 1892–1907: Østen G. Graver
- 1908–1919: Østen Uverud (V/FV)
- 1920–1922: Nils Hovinbøle (Ap)
- 1923–1934: Hans Grasdalen (V)
- 1935–1943: Gjermund S. Graver (Bp/NS)
- 1943–1944: Olav Uverud (NS)
- 1944–1945: Olav O. Urdal (NS)
- 1945–1945: O.N. Kvendalen (Ap)
- 1946–1947: Ole H. Johnsgård (Ap)
- 1947–1957: John J. Grov (Ap)
- 1957–1963: Halvor O. Rue (Ap)

== See also ==
- List of former municipalities of Norway
