= Hovin Church (Telemark) =

Church in Telemark, Norway

- Hovin kirke
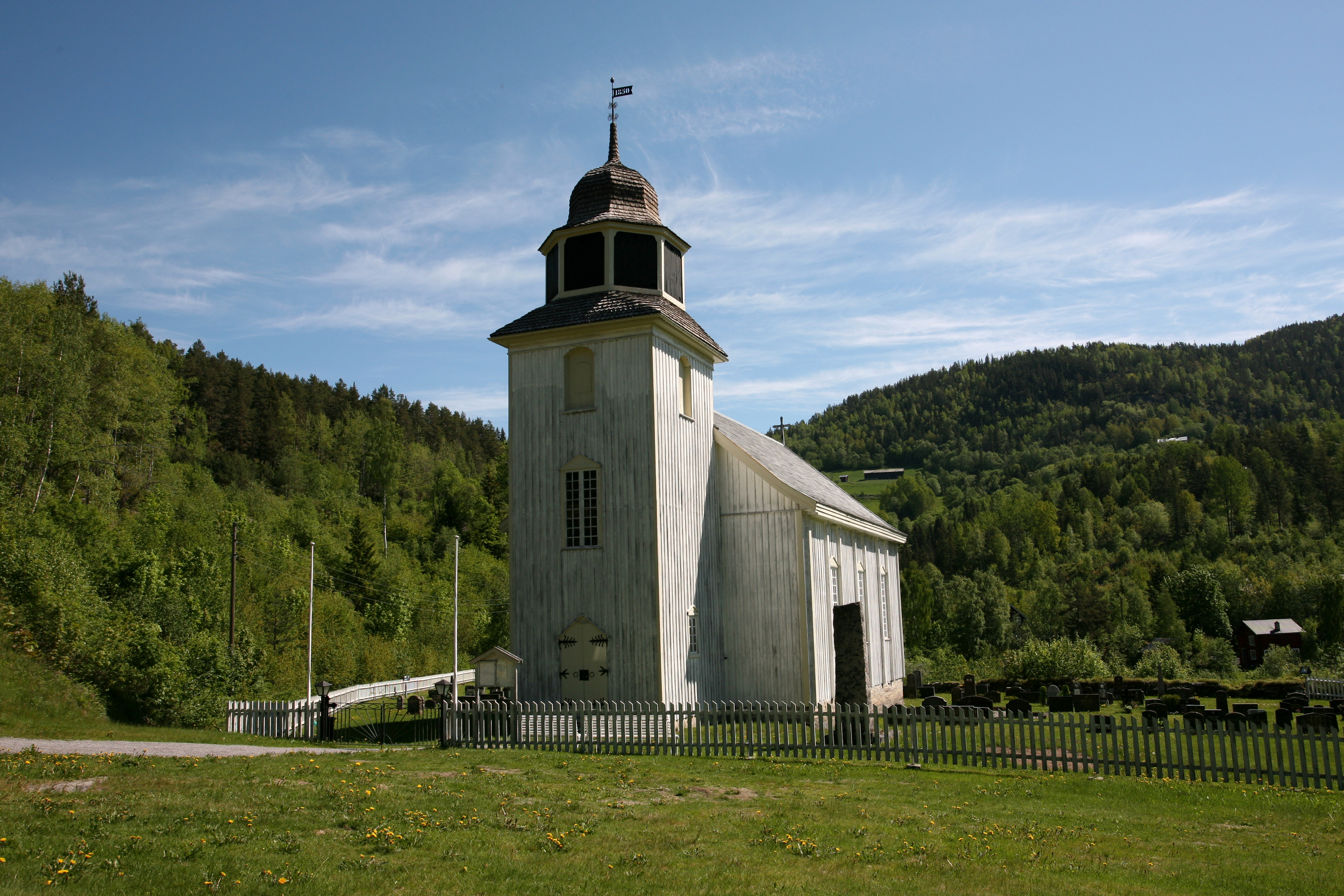
- View of the church
- Hovin Church
- 59°50′58″N 9°00′24″E
- Location: Tinn Municipality, Telemark
- Country: Norway
- Denomination: Church of Norway
- Previous denomination: Catholic Church
- Churchmanship: Evangelical Lutheran

History
- Status: Parish church
- Founded: c. 13th century
- Consecrated: 29 August 1850

Architecture
- Functional status: Active
- Architect: Hans Linstow
- Architectural type: Long church
- Completed: 1850 (176 years ago)

Specifications
- Capacity: 250
- Materials: Wood

Administration
- Diocese: Agder og Telemark
- Deanery: Øvre Telemark prosti
- Parish: Tinn
- Norwegian Cultural Heritage Site
- Type: Church
- Status: Automatically protected
- ID: 84655

Hovin Church (Norwegian: Hovin kirke) is a parish church of the Church of Norway in Tinn Municipality in Telemark county, Norway. It is located in the village of Hovin. It is one of the churches for the Tinn parish which is part of the Øvre Telemark prosti (deanery) in the Diocese of Agder og Telemark. The white, wooden church was built in a long church design in 1850 using plans drawn up by the architect Hans Linstow. The church seats about 250 people.

== History ==
The earliest existing historical records of the church date back to the year 1392, but that is not when the church was founded. The first church in Hovin was a wooden stave church that was located at Åsland, about 1.1 kilometres (0.68 mi) to the northeast of the present church site. The church may have been established during the 13th century. In 1392, the old church was torn down and a dispute arose over the placement of a new church which ended with it being built about 1.1 kilometres (0.68 mi) to the southwest, a little further downstream along the river Skirva, where the church stands today. This church was also a wooden stave church. In 1729, the church was either heavily repaired and renovated. In 1844, the old building was described as being too small and uncomfortable. At that time, it was agreed that a new church should be built. The parish chose designs by Hans Linstow (a larger version of the same drawings were used for the nearby Gransherad Church). The new church was built by the builder, Halvor Andreas Olsen from Kongsberg (who also built the Gransherad Church). The new church was consecrated on 29 August 1850. This church has a tower on the west end of the nave and there is a choir on the east end with a small sacristy extension further to the east. The bell tower has a rather unique bell-shaped roof.

== See also ==
- List of churches in Agder og Telemark
