= Klaus Egge =

Norwegian composer and music critic

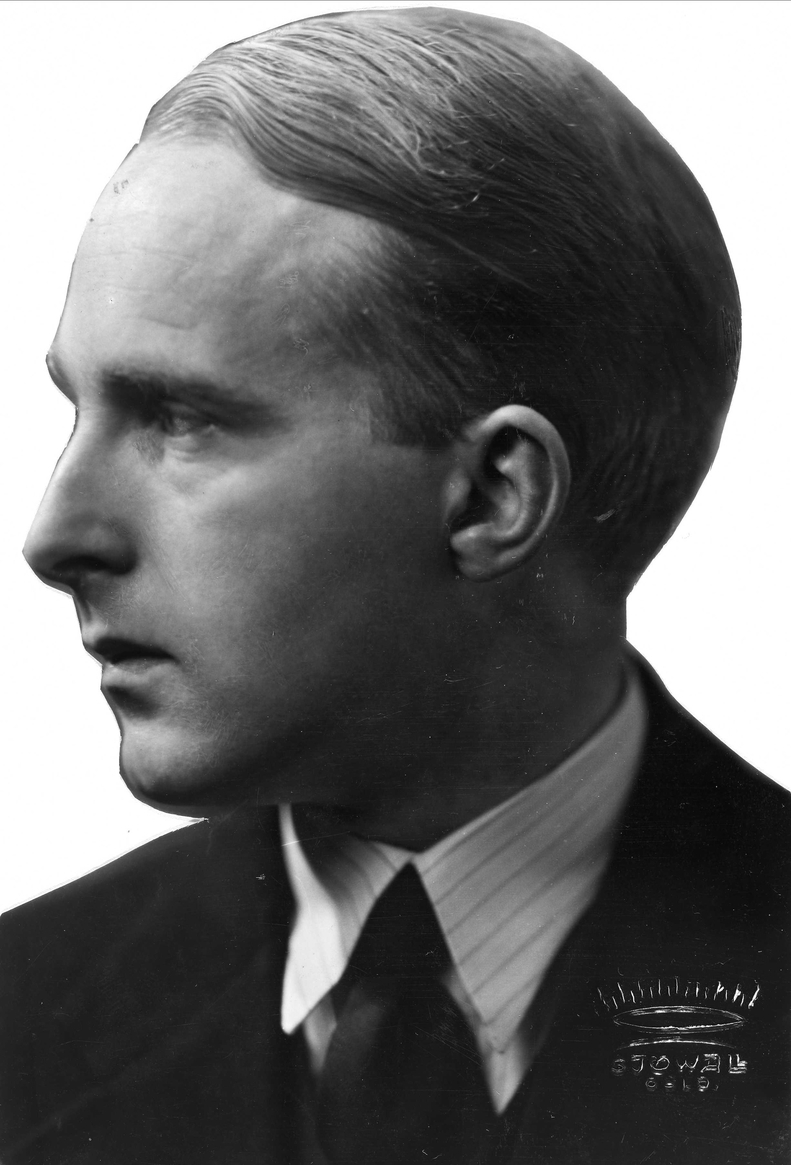
Klaus Egge

Klaus Egge (July 19, 1906 – March 7, 1979) was a Norwegian composer and music critic.

== Background ==
Egge was born in Gransherred Municipality in Telemark, Norway. He was the son of Rasmus Klausen Egge (1874-1962) and Rakel Abrahamsdatter Iversen (1877-1986). He graduated from the teacher school at Stord in 1927 and then started at the Norwegian Academy of Music in Oslo. He trained under Arild Sandvold on the organ and with Gustav Lange (1861-1939) in harmony. He graduated in 1929 and worked as a primary school teacher in the following years in Porsgrunn (1930–34). He continued his musical education with private lessons from Nils Larsen and composition lessons with Fartein Valen. On April 4, 1934, he debuted as a composer at the University of Oslo. In 1937–38, he studied with Walther Gmeindel (1890-1958) in Berlin. He taught at the Frogner, Berle and Vestheim Gymnasium until 1945.

== Career ==
Egge's musical development can be separated into three periods. In the first period, folk music was the central source of inspiration. The second period is the period where Egge develops a more universal tonal language. The second period peaks with his development into a metamorphic technique, one where a musical motif undergoes repeated transformations. The third period can be defined as the time Egge explores the twelve-tone technique.

The piano works Draumkvæ Sonata and Fantasi i Halling, generally viewed as standards in Norwegian repertoire, are both pieces that represent Egge's first compositional period. Following the Second World War, the folk music elements of Egge's compositions gradually became less pronounced, and were succeeded by a more universal tonal language. Egge retains his distinct, clear diatonic passages, frequently contrasted by sharp dissonances. One of the distinct traits of this compositional period is Egge's development of a metamorphosis technique, in which motifs are subjected to repeated transformations. This technique reaches its pinnacle with Egge's 1966 Cello Concerto, the first movement entitled Preludio metamorfico.

Egge's final compositional period was characterized by his focus on twelve-tone technique. The composer's first foray into this field is found in his Symphony No. 4 Sinfonia sopra BACH-EGGE op. 30, commissioned by the Detroit Symphony Orchestra in 1967. Tone row techniques are employed by Egge in works such as Symphony No. 5, Piano Concerto and Wind Quintet composed in 1976.

Egge's list of major works includes five symphonies, three piano concertos, one violin concerto and a cello concerto. His chamber music works also constitute a major part of his output: a string quartet, a piano trio, two woodwind quintets, a violin sonata and a number of piano works. Egge also focused on vocal compositions and has penned songs and choir works, a capella, with piano, and with orchestral accompaniment. Major Egge choir works include Sveinung Vreim, written for soloists, choir and orchestra, based on the saga of Sveinung Vreim as depicted in the poem Jonsoknatt by Hans Henrik Holm. Egge's works have seen frequent performances at home as well as throughout Europe and the US.

== Personal life ==
In 1972, he received the Arts Council Norway Honorary Award (Norsk kulturråds ærespris). He was also a Commander of the Order of St. Olav (1977) and of the Icelandic Order of the Falcon.

In 1945, he married Helga Sigrid Raugstad. They were the parents of Guri Egge (born 1948) and theatrical director Kjetil Egge (born 1950). Klaus Egge died in 1979 and was buried at Vår Frelsers gravlund in Oslo.

== Works ==
=== Orchestral ===
- Symphony No. 1 Lagnadstonar, Op. 17 (1942)
- Symphony No. 2 Sinfonia giocosa, Op. 22 (1947)
- Symphony No. 3 Louisville, Op. 28 (1957)
- Symphony No. 4 Sinfonia seriale sopra BACH-EGGE, Op. 30 (1967)
- Symphony No. 5 Sinfonia dolce, Op. 31 (1969)

=== Concertante ===
- Piano Concerto No. 1, Op. 9 (1937)
- Piano Concerto No. 2, Op. 21 (1944)
- Violin Concerto, Op. 26 (1953)
- Cello Concerto, Op. 29 (1966)
- Piano Concerto No. 3, Op. 32 (1973)

=== Vocal/Choral ===
- Sveinung Vreim, Op. 11, symphonic epic for soloist, choir and orchestra (1940)
- Fjell-Norig, Op. 15, symphonic folk song for soprano and orchestra (1941)
- The Norway Song, Op. 16 (1942)
- Draumar i Stjernesnø (Dreams in Starry Snow), Op. 18, for voice and piano (1944)
- Elskhugskvede, Op. 19, for voice and string orchestra (1942)

=== Chamber ===
- Violin Sonata, Op. 3 (1932)
- String Quartet, Op. 5 (1933)
- Wind Quintet, Op. 13 (1939)
- Piano Trio, Op. 14 (1940)
- Duo Concertante for Violin and Viola, Op. 23 (1950)

=== Piano ===
- Two Pieces for Piano (Valse dolce and Akvarell), Op. 1 (1927)
- Piano Sonata No. 1 Draumkvede, Op. 4 (1933)
- Three Fantasies for Piano, Op. 12 (1939)
- Piano Sonata No. 2 Sonata patetica, Op. 27 (1954)
- The Cuckoo Song (1944)

== Discography ==
- Conrad Baden, Klaus Egge, Alfred Janson, Bjarne Brustad, Contemporary Music From Norway (1967)
- Klaus Egge, Knut Nystedt, The Hindar String Quartet, String Quartet No. 1 Op. 5 / String Quartet No. 4 Op. 56 (1968)
- Klaus Egge, Camilla Wicks, Oslo Philharmonic Orchestra, Øivin Fjeldstad, Kjell Bækkelund, Violin-Concerto, Op. 26 / Piano Sonata No. 2 (1968)
- Odd Grüner-Hegge, Klaus Egge, Contemporary Music From Norway (1971)
- Klaus Egge, Finn Mortensen, Egil Hovland, Symphony No. 4 Op. 30 / Fantasy For Piano And Orchestra, Op. 27 / Lamenti For Orchestra, Op. 43 (1971)
- Sonata Over The «Dream Vision» Tune For Piano, Op. 4 / Piano Concerto No. 2, Op. 21 (1972 )
- Trondheim Symphony Orchestra, Eva Knardal, Piano Concerto No. 2 Op. 21 / Symphony No. 1 O. 17 (1988)
- Kjell Bækkelund, Arietta - 38 Klassiske Klaverperler (1994)
- Quattro Stagioni, Cantio (1994)
- Klaus Egge, Torleif Torgersen, Piano Works (1999)
- Fartein Valen, Klaus Egge, Johan Kvandal, Alfred Janson, Oslo String Quartet, Norwegian 20th-Century String Quartets (2000)
- Kjell Bækkelund, Crescendo (2005)
- Klaus Egge, Håvard Gimse, TrondheimSoloists, Øyvind Gimse, Piano Concerto No. 2, Piano Sonata No. 1 "Draumkvædet" Halling Fantasy (2007)
- Fartein Valen, Klaus Egge, Finn Mortensen, Rolf Wallin, Håkon Austbø, Norwegian Imperatives (2009)

== Other sources ==
- Kennedy, Michael (2006), The Oxford Dictionary of Music, 985 pages, ISBN 0-19-861459-4

Awards
Preceded by Alf Rolfsen	Recipient of the Norsk kulturråds ærespris 1972	Succeeded by Hans Heiberg
