= Aust-Telemark =

District in Telemark, Norway

Aust-Telemark Øvre Telemark østfjelske (historic)
- District
- The 2 municipalities in the south are not always included in Aust-Telemark.
- Coordinates: 59°42′55″N 8°49′37″E
- Country: Norway
- County: Telemark
- Region: Østlandet

Area
  - Total: 4,769 km^{2} (1,841 sq mi)

Population (2022)
  - Total: 37,136
  - Density: 7.787/km^{2} (20.17/sq mi)
- Demonym(s): Teledøl; Telemarking

Aust-Telemark (lit. 'East-Telemark') is a traditional district in Telemark county in Norway. The district comprises five municipalities: Hjartdal, Midt-Telemark, Nome, Notodden, and Tinn. The largest population centres in the region are the cities Notodden and Rjukan, of which Notodden is by far the largest with about 9,000 inhabitants. Hjartdal is scarcely populated.

Historically, the district was made up of the three munincipalities of Hjartdal, Tinn, and Heddal, which were created in 1838 when the formannskapsdistrikt laws came into effect. In 1860, Gransherad Municipality was created from portions of Tinn and Hjartdal. Hovin Municipality was created by a split from Gransherad Municipality in 1886, and Notodden Municipality was created by a split from Heddal Municipality in 1913. In 1964 Heddal Municipality and Gransherad Municipality were incorporated into Notodden Municipality whereas Hovin Municipality was incorporated into Tinn Municipality. More recently, the areas of Midt-Telemark Municipality and Nome Municipality have been included in Aust-Telemark as well, although they were historically included in the old Nedre Telemark district ("Lower Telemark"), but that district is not really used anymore in favor of the Grenland district name which has slightly different boundaries.

Notable people from Aust-Telemark include Myllarguten (1801-1872), legendary fiddler from Sauherad, Klaus Egge (1906-1979), composer from Gransherad and Hans Herbjørnsrud (born 1938), author from Heddal.
