= Jondalen =

Valley in Kongsberg municipality, Norway

Coordinates: 59.7031°N 9.5236°E

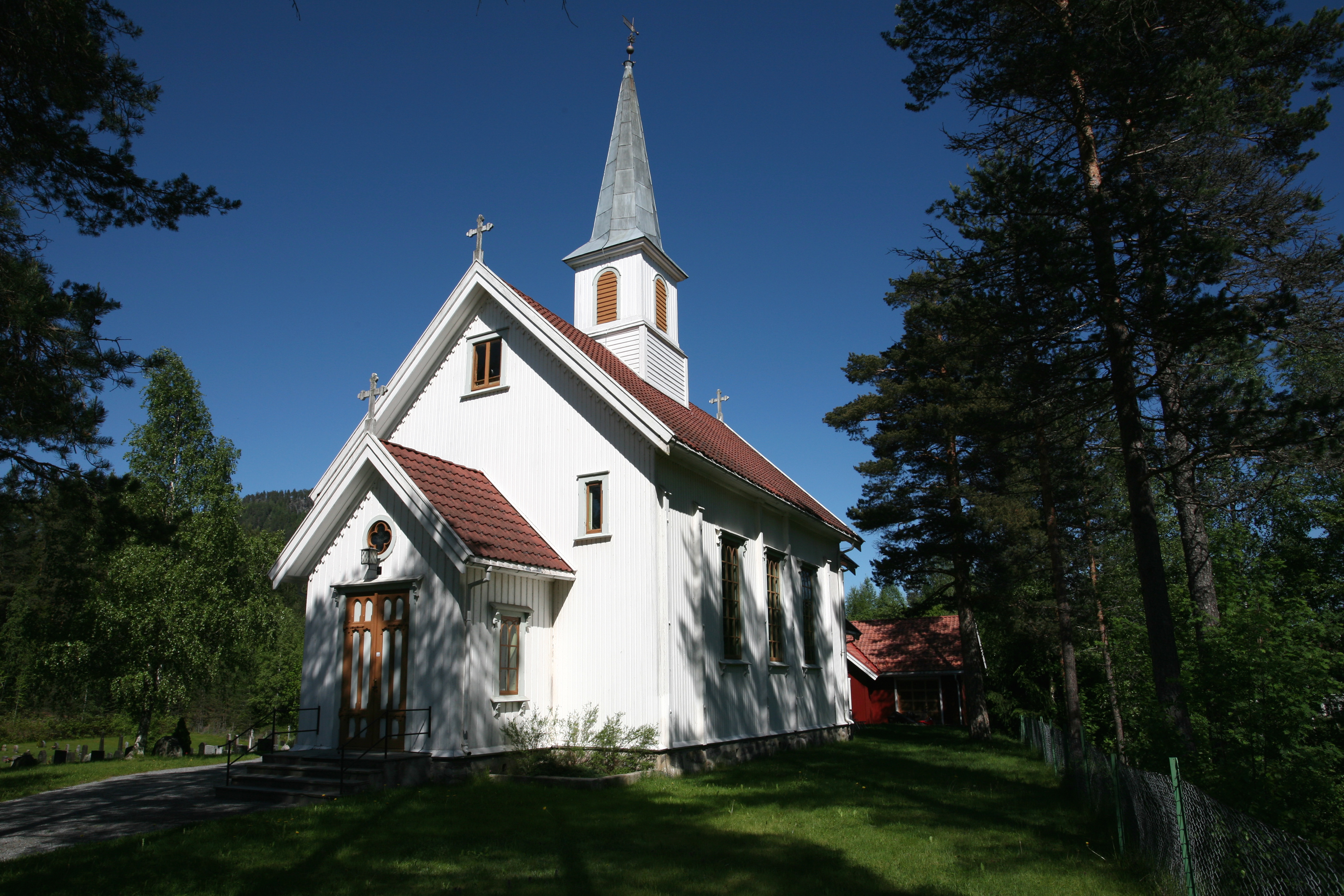
Jondalen Church

Jondalen is a valley in Kongsberg municipality, Norway, outside the city of Kongsberg. Its history is closely tied to Kongsberg and the Kongsberg Silver Mines. The river Jondalselva runs through the valley. Jondalen Church was built in 1882. Jondalen became an independent district in 1861, and was incorporated into the new, larger Kongsberg municipality in 1964.

== Literature ==
- Norske Gardsbruk, 2 vols.
- Tho, Hallvard: Stedsnavnene i Jondalen. Oslo 1949.
