= Heddal =

Heddal may refer to:

== Places ==
- Heddal (village), a village in Notodden Municipality in Telemark county, Norway
- Heddal Municipality, a former municipality in Telemark county, Norway
- Heddal prestegjeld, a former geographic subdivision of the Church of Norway in Telemark county, Norway
- Heddal Stave Church, a historic church in Notodden Municipality in Telemark county, Norway
- Heddal Open Air Museum, a museum in Notodden Municipality in Telemark county, Norway
- Lake Heddal, or Heddalsvatnet, a lake in Notodden and Midt-Telemark municipalities in Telemark county, Norway

== See also ==
- Hitterdal (disambiguation), an older Norwegian spelling of Heddal
