= Lars Aspeflaten =

Norwegian barrister and politician

Lars Aspeflaten (15 July 1924 – 7 February 2010) was a Norwegian barrister and politician for the Liberal Party.

== Early life and World War II ==
He was born in Bamble Municipality, and grew up there.

During the occupation of Norway by Nazi Germany he joined Milorg in 1941. He had to go into hiding for some time, and also had to flee to Sweden. During the liberation of Norway in 1945 he served as personal bodyguard of the acting Director of Public Prosecutions, Sven Arntzen.

== Post-war career ==
After the occupation's end, he graduated in law from the University of Oslo in 1947. He then worked as a secretary for Karl Evang in the Norwegian Directorate for Health before being hired as deputy judge in Tinn and Heddal District Court. He also served as acting district stipendiary magistrate (konstituert sorenskriver) for some time. He participated as a judge in the legal purge in Norway after World War II, and at his death, he was known as one of the few surviving judges from this special period. In 1951, he changed job to lawyer and from 1962, he was a barrister with access to work on Supreme Court cases. He worked out of Brevik and Porsgrunn, and was a prolific defender in Skien and Porsgrunn District Court.

Aspeflaten was also involved in politics, and served as a deputy representative to the Parliament of Norway from Telemark during the term 1954–1957. In total, he participated in ten days of parliamentary sessions. In 1973 he stood for election for the Liberal People's Party. He was a member of the municipal council of Bamble Municipality for twenty years and Telemark county council for twelve years.

Aspeflaten was married for the last sixty-one years of his life. He died in February 2010.
