= Telemark District Court =

Former district court in Norway

- Telemark tingrett
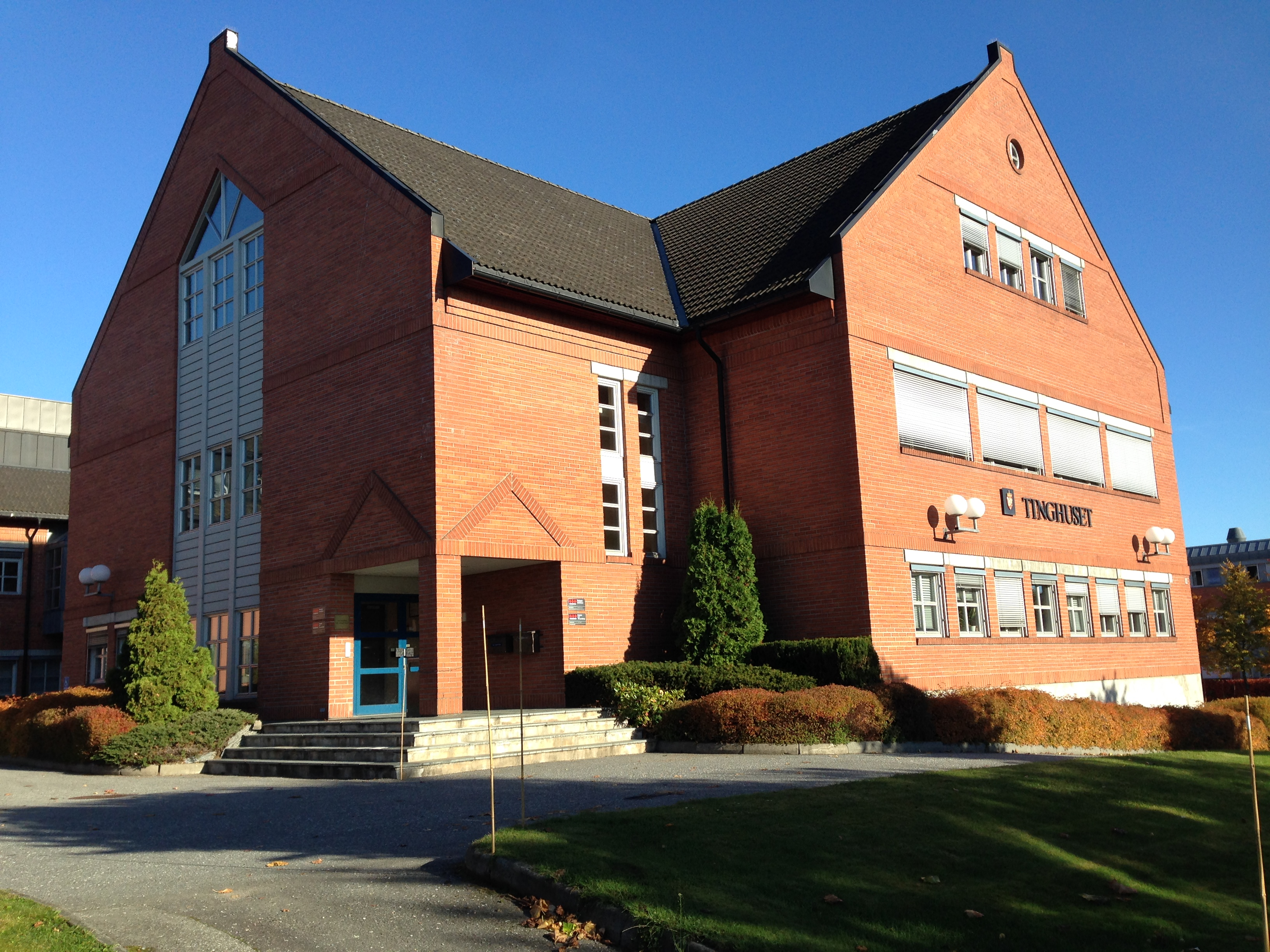
- Courthouse in Skien
- 59°13′08″N 9°35′54″E
- Established: 26 April 2021
- Dissolved: 9 Jun3 2025
- Jurisdiction: Telemark, Norway
- Location: Skien, Notodden, and Kviteseid
- Coordinates: 59°13′08″N 9°35′54″E
- Appeals to: Agder Court of Appeal

Telemark District Court (Norwegian: Telemark tingrett) was a district court located in Telemark county, Norway. This court was based at three different courthouses which were located in Skien, Notodden, and Kviteseid. The court was subordinate to the Agder Court of Appeal. The court served the 17 municipalities in Telemark county.

- The courthouse in Skien accepted cases from the municipalities of Bamble, Drangedal, Kragerø, Nome, Porsgrunn, Siljan, and Skien.
- The courthouse in Kviteseid accepted cases from the municipalities of Fyresdal, Kviteseid, Nissedal, Seljord, Tokke, and Vinje.
- The courthouse in Notodden accepted cases from the municipalities of Hjartdal, Midt-Telemark, Notodden, and Tinn.

The court was led by a chief judge (sorenskriver) and several other judges. The court was a court of first instance. Its judicial duties were mainly to settle criminal cases and to resolve civil litigation as well as bankruptcy. The administration and registration tasks of the court included death registration, issuing certain certificates, performing duties of a notary public, and officiating civil wedding ceremonies. Cases from this court were heard by a combination of professional judges and lay judges.

== History ==
This court was established on 26 April 2021 after the old Aust-Telemark District Court, Nedre Telemark District Court, and Vest-Telemark District Court were all merged into one court. The new district court system continued to use the courthouses from the predecessor courts. On 10 June 2025, the court was dissolved and divided into two new courts: Nedre Telemark District Court (coastal parts of the county) and Øvre Telemark District Court (inland parts of the county).
