= Heddal Open Air Museum =

Open-air museum in Heddal, Norway

Coordinates: 59°34′30″N 9°10′50″E

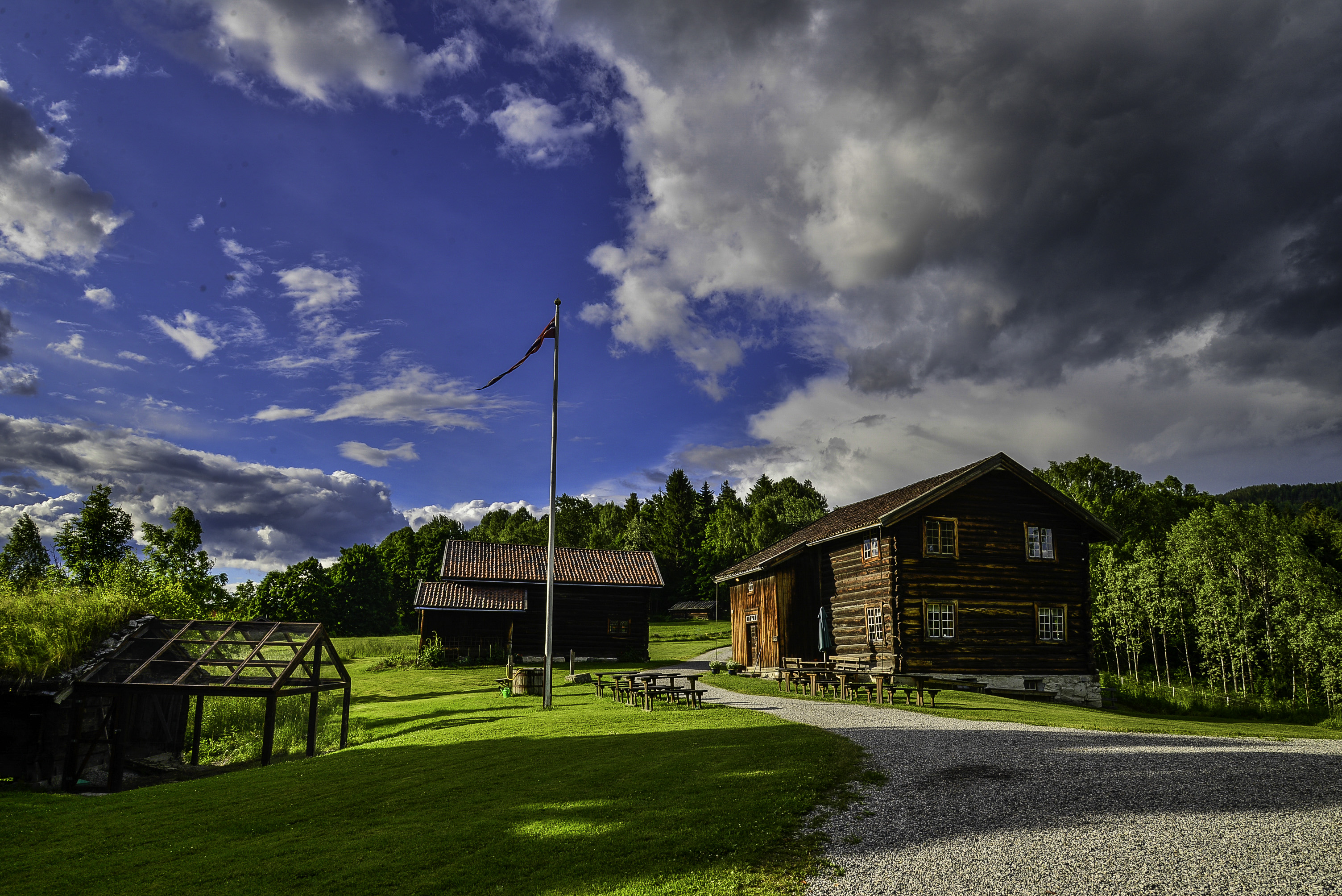
Heddal bygdetun

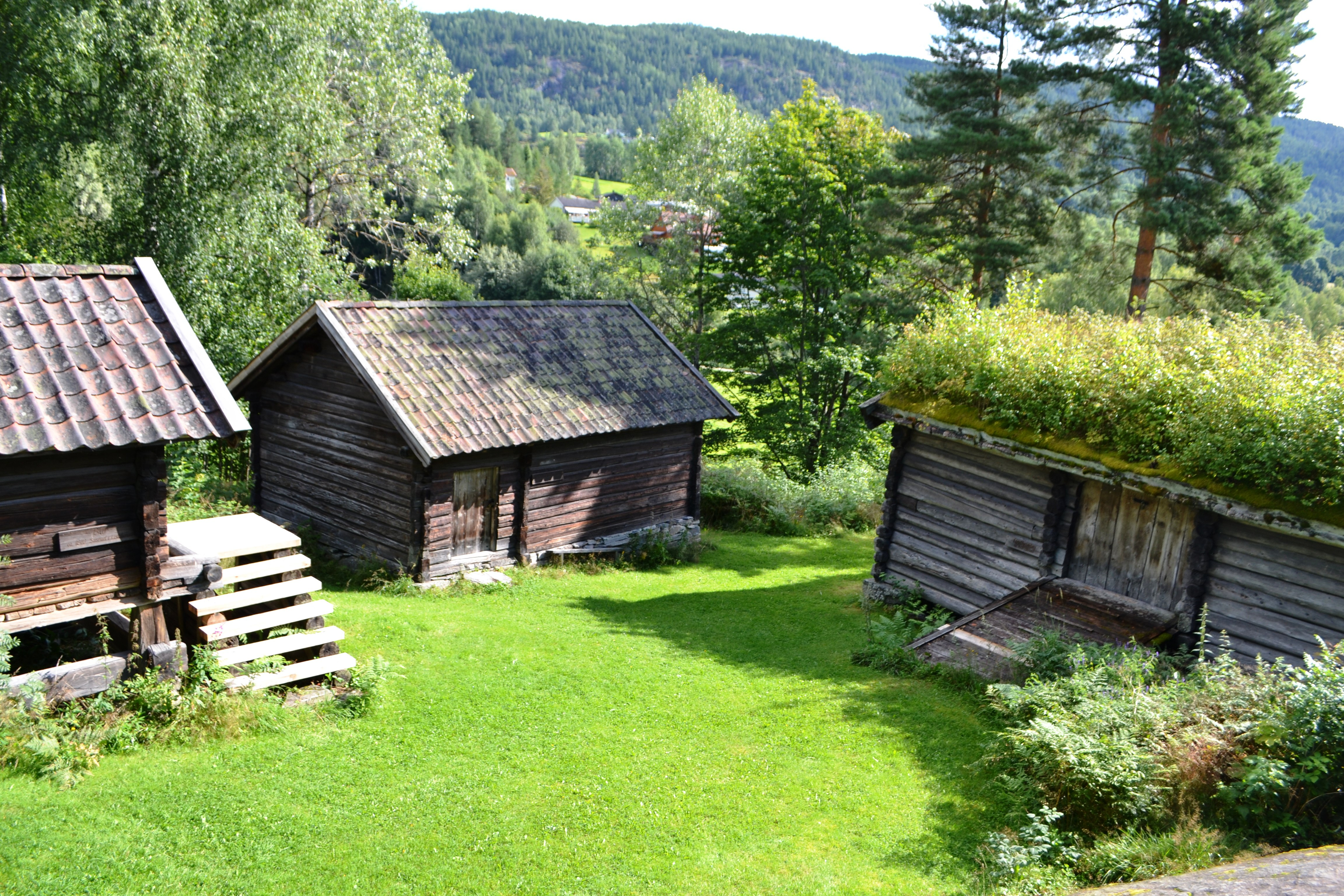
Husmannsplassen Hola

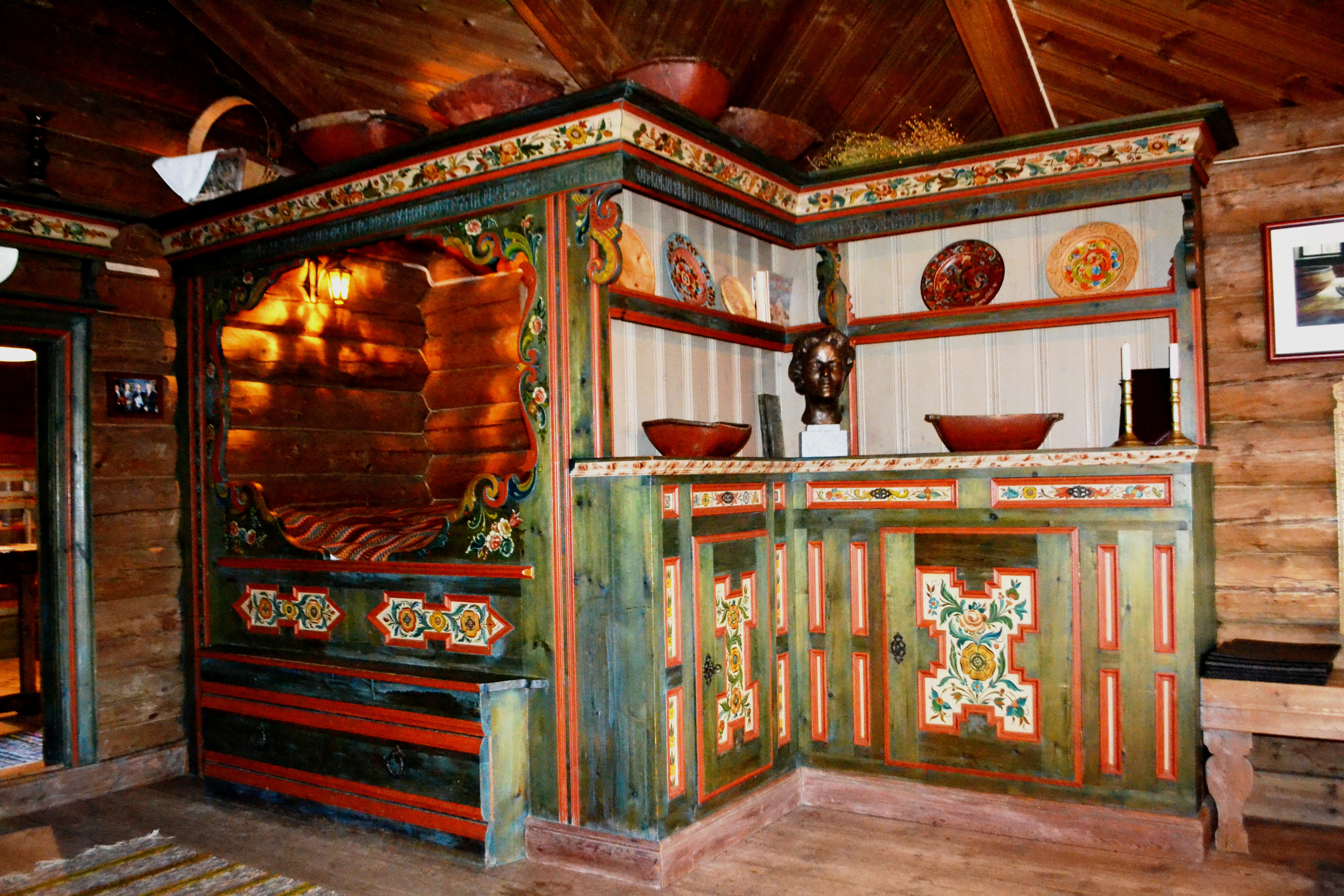
Fyrileivstugu

Heddal Open Air Museum (Heddal bygdetun) is an open-air museum located in the village of Heddal in Notodden Municipality in Telemark county, Norway.

Heddal Open Air Museum is located near the historic Heddal Stave Church. Heddal Museum has various buildings representative of the history of local farming dating from the Middle Ages and up to the 1930s. Fyrileivstugu, a living room interior dating from 1932, was transferred to Heddal Museum in 1990. It was the work of noted wood carver and rosemaling artist, Olav Fyrileiv (1875–1975) who was a Telemark native.

In 2010, the Norwegian Industrial Workers Museum, which is located nearby at Rjukan in Tinn Municipality, took over operational management of Heddal Open Air Museum. Heddal and Notodden Museum Society (Heddal og Notodden museumslag) retained ownership of the buildings and collections.

The museum can be visited from 15 June through 15 August every summer. Heddal is a living museum, with animals raised on the premises.
