= Vest-Telemark District Court =

Former district court in Norway

- Vest-Telemark tingrett
- 59°24′07″N 8°29′41″E
- Established: 1591
- Dissolved: 26 April 2021
- Jurisdiction: Western Telemark
- Location: Kviteseid, Norway
- Coordinates: 59°24′07″N 8°29′41″E
- Appeals to: Agder Court of Appeal

Vest-Telemark District Court (Norwegian: Vest-Telemark tingrett) was a district court in Telemark county, Norway. The court was based in Kviteseid. The court existed until 2021. It had jurisdiction over the municipalities of Fyresdal, Kviteseid, Nissedal, Seljord, Tokke, and Vinje. Cases from this court could be appealed to Agder Court of Appeal.

The court was a court of first instance. Its judicial duties were mainly to settle criminal cases and to resolve civil litigation as well as bankruptcy. The administration and registration tasks of the court included death registration, issuing certain certificates, performing duties of a notary public, and officiating civil wedding ceremonies. Cases from this court were heard by a combination of professional judges and lay judges.

== History ==
The court was originally established in 1591 as Øvre Telemarken Vestfjelske District Court (lit. 'Upper Telemark West-Mountains') in 1591. The court initially covered the current municipalities of Fyresdal, Tokke, and Vinje. On 28 August 1714 the Øvre Telemarken Østfjelske District Court (lit. 'Upper Telemark East-Mountains') was dissolved and its geographical jurisdiction was divided between neighboring courts. At that time Seljord, Nissedal, and Kviteseid became part of this court.

On 17 December 1756, the areas of Hjartdal and Gransherad were transferred from the Nedre Telemark District Court to this one. On 21 December 1832, the old Øvre Telemarken Østfjelske District Court was re-established (it had been dissolved in 1714). At that time, Seljord, Hjartdal, and Gransherad were moved to the newly re-established court.

In 2002, the court's name was changed to Vest-Telemark District Court. On 1 January 2007, the old Nedre Telemark District Court was closed and its geographical jurisdiction was divided between other neighboring courts. The areas of Seljord Municipality was then added to the area of this court at that time.

On 26 April 2021, Vest-Telemark District Court was merged with the Aust-Telemark District Court and Nedre Telemark District Court to create the new Telemark District Court.
