= Sveinung O. Flaaten (politician, born 1953) =

Norwegian politician

Sveinung O. Flaaten (born 11 February 1953) was a Norwegian lawyer, judge and politician for the Conservative Party.

He was born in Elverum as a son of teacher Olav S. Flaaten. After finishing his secondary education in 1971, he eventually graduated from the University of Oslo with the cand.jur. degree in 1979. From then until 1981, Flaaten concurrently lectured at the university while also working a parliamentary group secretary for the Conservative Party. From 1981 to 1983 he was a State Secretary in Willoch's First Cabinet.

As the cabinet was changed to Willoch's Second Cabinet in 1983, Flaaten started working as a lawyer, before being appointed district stipendiary magistrate of Tinn and Heddal District Court in 1988.

Flaaten was given a leave of absence from his position as a judge to run for the mayoral office in the Norwegian local elections, 1991. A multi-partisan ballot won the local election in Notodden Municipality, ousting the Labour Party from office following a continuous string of Labour mayors post-World War II. Flaaten was the one who assumed the position of mayor, but resigned in February 1993. Flaaten subsequently resigned his membership in the Conservative Party as well. He eventually started voting Labour, and ultimately joined the party in 2010.

Flaaten did not return as a district stipendiary magistrate, opting to become a law firm partner in Oslo in 1993. He also operated a farm in Lisleherad.
