= Egil Bergsland =

Norwegian politician (1924–2007)

Egil Bergsland (born 2 September 1924 in Notodden, died 12 October 2007) was a Norwegian politician for the Labour Party.

He was elected to the Norwegian Parliament from Telemark in 1977, but was not re-elected in 1981. He had previously served as a deputy representative during the term 1973–1977.

On the local level he was a member of the municipal council of Heddal Municipality from 1955 to 1964, and then of the municipal council of Notodden Municipality from 1964 to 1967 as deputy mayor. He served as mayor from 1971 to 1975. From 1963 to 1983 he was also a member of Telemark county council. He chaired the local party chapter from 1968 to 1969.

Outside politics he spent his entire career in Norsk Hydro, advancing from laborer in 1946-1958 all the way up to assisting director in 1976–1985.
