= Gransherad Church =

Church in Telemark, Norway

- Gransherad kyrkje
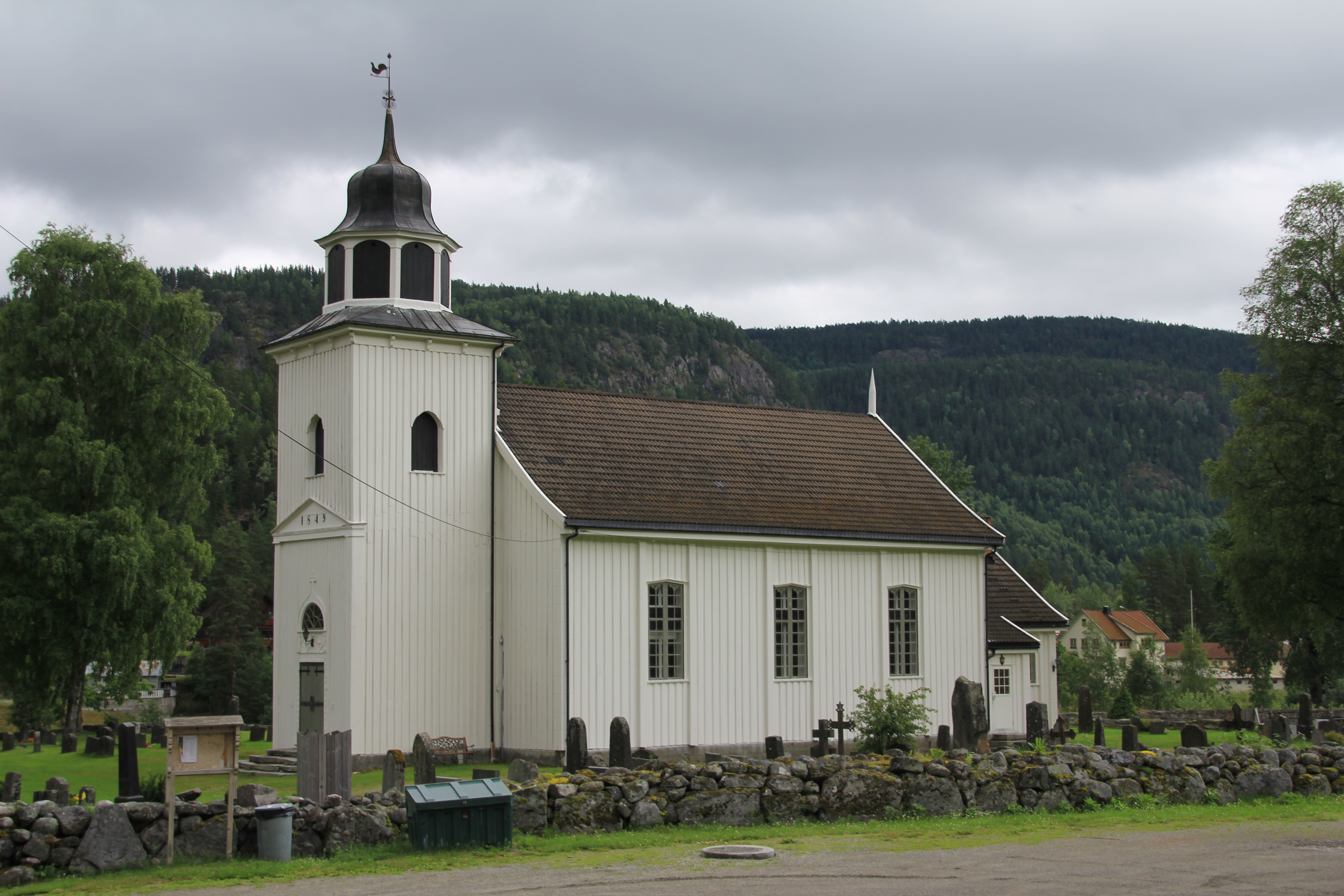
- View of the church
- Gransherad Church
- 59°41′22″N 9°02′09″E
- Location: Notodden Municipality, Telemark
- Country: Norway
- Denomination: Church of Norway
- Previous denomination: Catholic Church
- Churchmanship: Evangelical Lutheran

History
- Status: Parish church
- Founded: 13th century
- Consecrated: 11 Sept 1849

Architecture
- Functional status: Active
- Architect: Hans Linstow
- Architectural type: Long church
- Completed: 1849 (177 years ago)

Specifications
- Capacity: 250
- Materials: Wood

Administration
- Diocese: Agder og Telemark
- Deanery: Øvre Telemark prosti
- Parish: Gransherad
- Norwegian Cultural Heritage Site
- Type: Church
- Status: Automatically protected
- ID: 84407

Gransherad Church (Norwegian: Gransherad kyrkje) is a parish church of the Church of Norway in Notodden Municipality in Telemark county, Norway. It is located in the village of Gransherad. It is the church for the Gransherad parish which is part of the Øvre Telemark prosti (deanery) in the Diocese of Agder og Telemark. The white, wooden church was built in a long church design in 1849 using plans drawn up by the architect Hans Linstow. The church seats about 250 people.

== History ==
The earliest existing historical records of the church date back to the year 1369, but that was not the year the church was built. The first church in Gransherad was a wooden stave church that was located about 25 metres (82 ft) to the northwest of the present church site. The church was dedicated to Saint Olav and it was possibly built during the 13th century. The building was extensively rebuilt over the years, so that it was difficult to see the stave church character towards the end. It appears from an inspection report from 1668 that the church had open-air corridors surrounding the nave and chancel, but later they were removed when windows were installed on the long wall of the nave. Later, the whole nave was torn down and replaced with a new timber-framed nave. The church eventually fell into disrepair and the best plan for moving forwards was to replace the building. So in 1845–1849, a new church was built on the south side of the churchyard, about 25 metres (82 ft) to the southeast. The last service in the old church was held on 11 August 1849, and then the church was demolished on 20-21 August 1849.

The new church was consecrated on 11 September 1849. The new Gransherad church is a log construction that was built by master builder Halvor Andreas Olsen using plans drawn up by Hans Linstow. The church is a wooden long church with a west tower over the church porch. The choir has the same width as the nave. A sacristy was built in 1939. In 1985, a detached building was built to the south of the church which contains some storage rooms as well as public toilets for the church.

== Media gallery ==
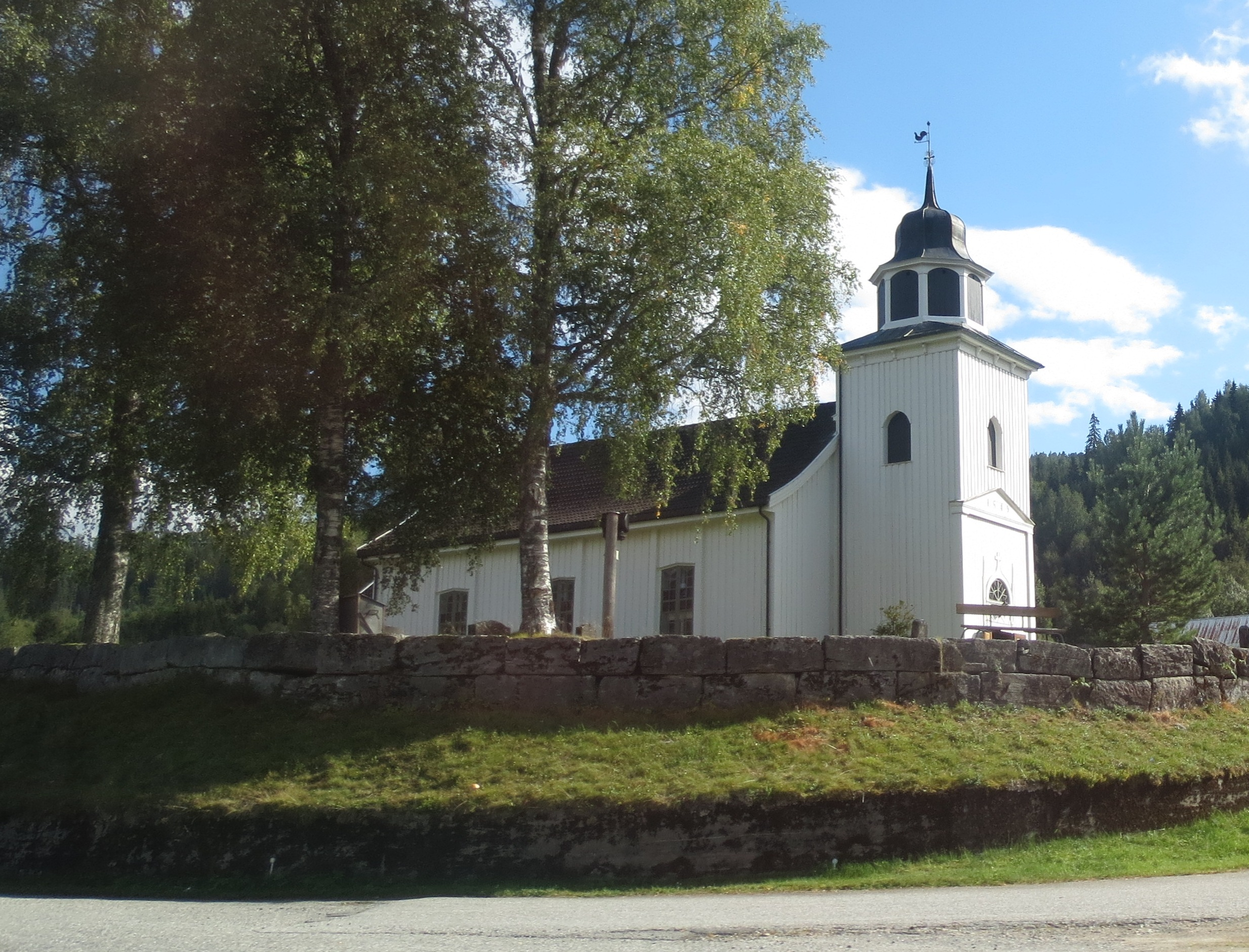

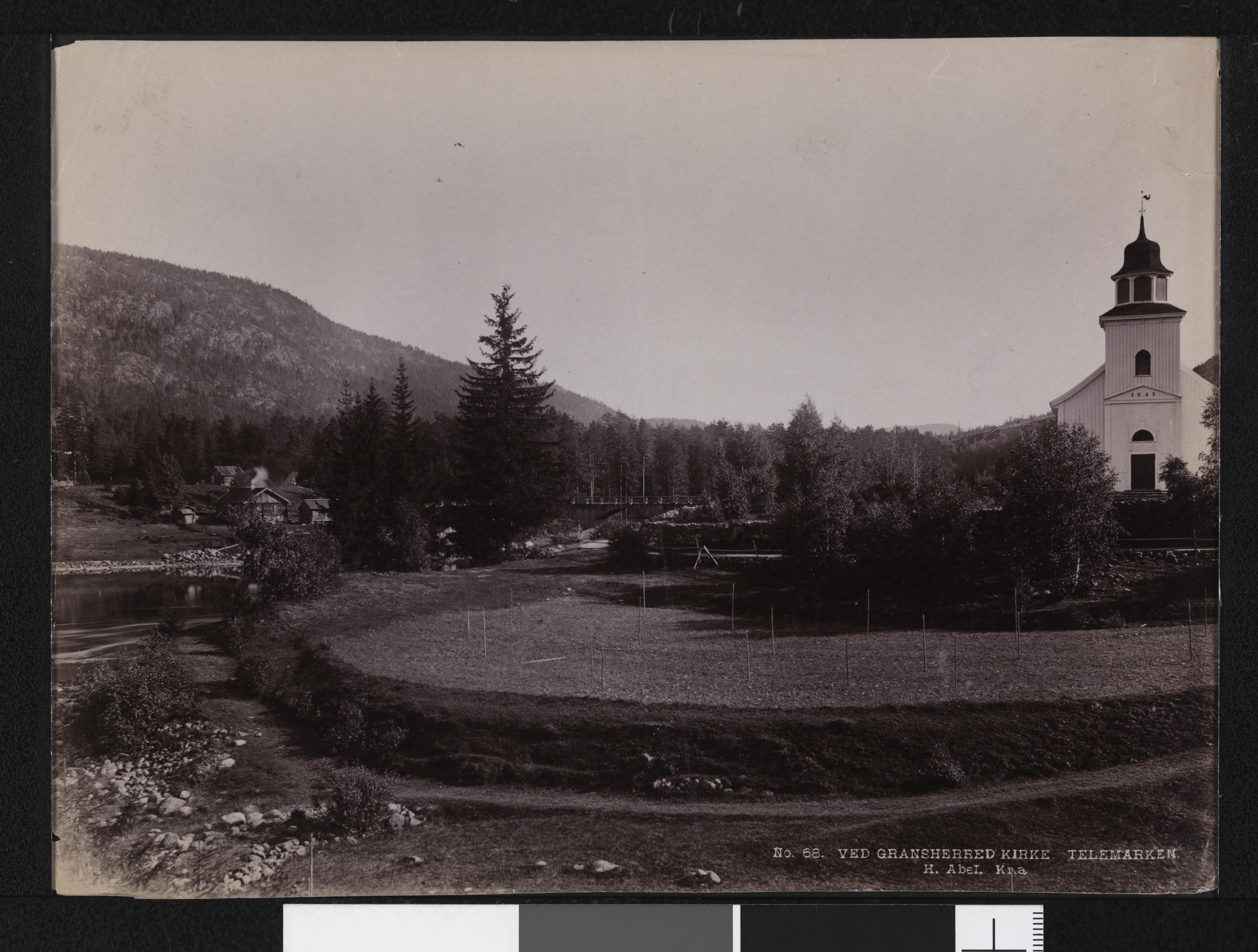

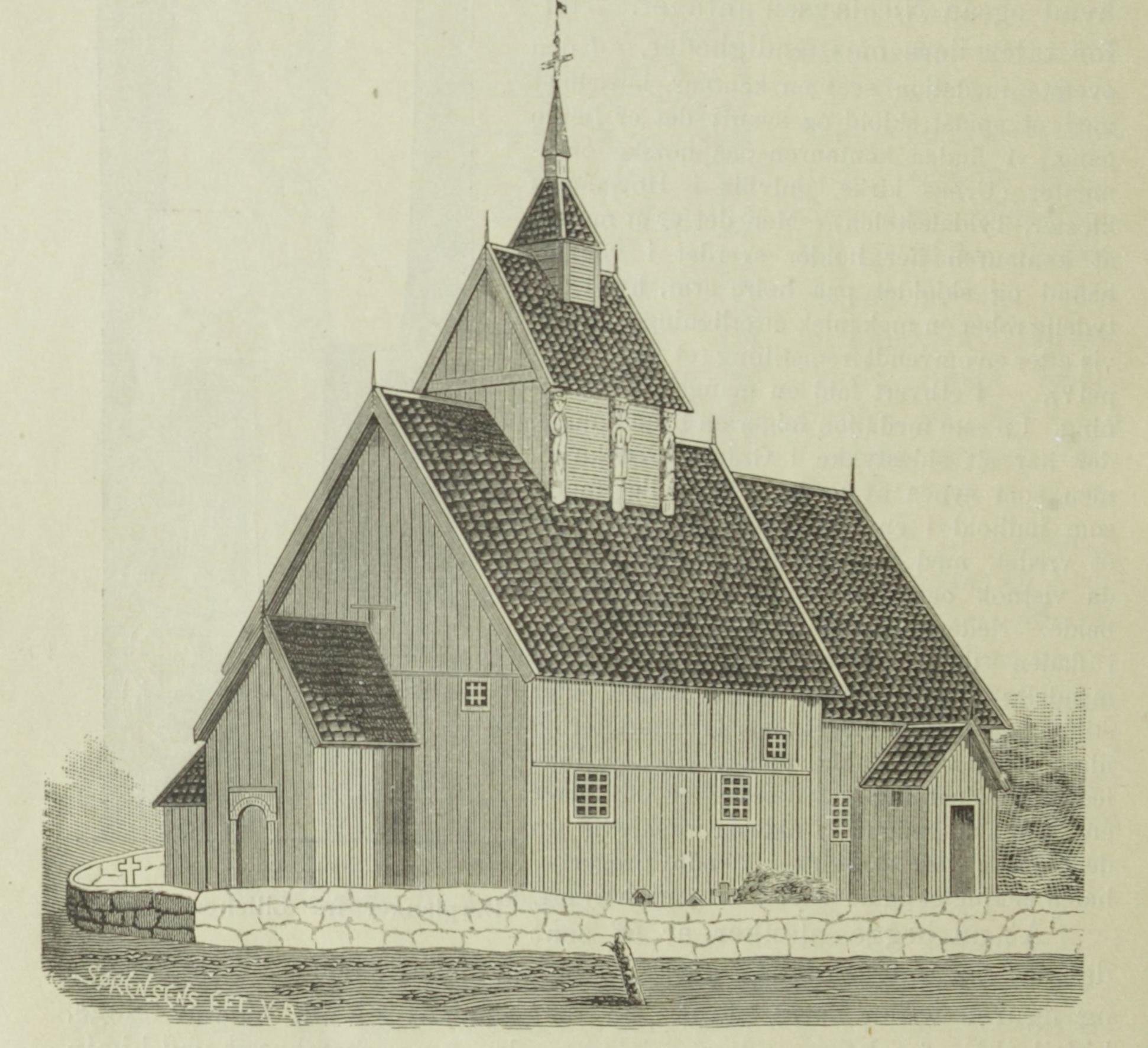
View of the old church

== See also ==
- List of churches in Agder og Telemark
