= Notodden Church =

Church in Telemark, Norway

- Notodden kirke
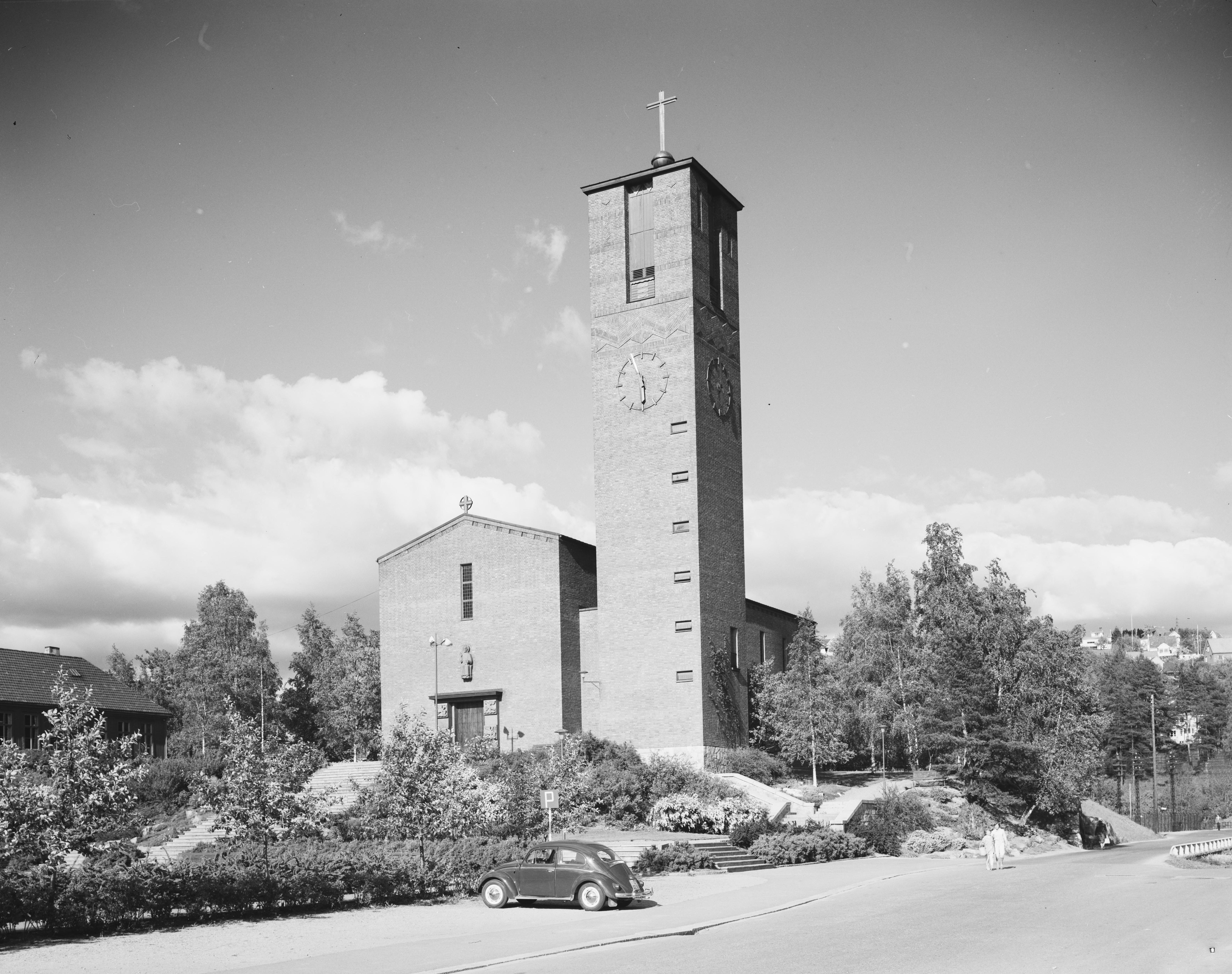
- View of the church
- Notodden Church
- 59°33′41″N 9°15′54″E
- Location: Notodden Municipality, Telemark
- Country: Norway
- Denomination: Church of Norway
- Churchmanship: Evangelical Lutheran

History
- Status: Parish church
- Founded: 1938
- Consecrated: 20 February 1938

Architecture
- Functional status: Active
- Architect(s): Dagfinn Morseth and Mads Wiel Gedde
- Architectural type: Long church
- Completed: 1938 (88 years ago)

Specifications
- Capacity: 330
- Materials: Brick

Administration
- Diocese: Agder og Telemark
- Deanery: Øvre Telemark prosti
- Parish: Notodden
- Norwegian Cultural Heritage Site
- Type: Church
- Status: Listed
- ID: 85176

Notodden Church (Norwegian: Notodden kirke) is a parish church of the Church of Norway in Notodden Municipality in Telemark county, Norway. It is located in the town of Notodden. It is the church for the Notodden parish which is part of the Øvre Telemark prosti (deanery) in the Diocese of Agder og Telemark. The red brick church was built in a long church design in 1938 using plans drawn up by the architects Dagfinn Morseth and Mads Wiel Gedde. The church seats about 330 people.

== History ==
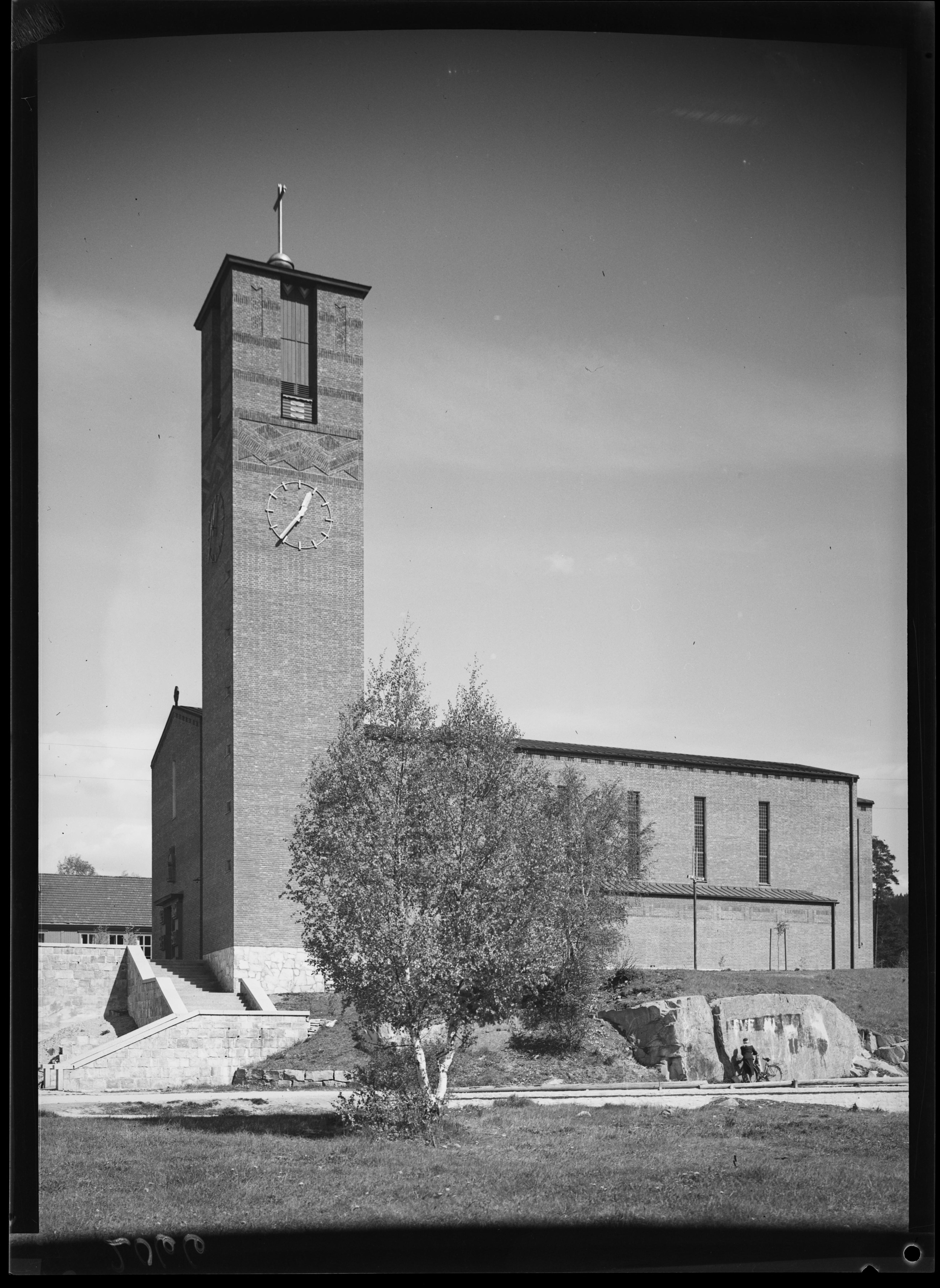
Side view of the church

In 1913, the village of Notodden was designated as a kjøpstad (town) and it was separated from Heddal Municipality to become a municipality of its own. In 1914, the new town of Notodden became its own parish, although it did not have its own church at that time. The town got its own cemetery at the end of 1915, and the planning for a new church went on for a number of years with some setbacks. Land was finally purchased for the church in 1928, and in 1932 an architectural competition was held with 95 submitted proposals. It was won by Dagfinn Morseth and Mads Wiel Gedde, but it took a few years before the project was carried out. The local factory financed the new church building, and there is also a statue of the factory's director, Ole Halvor Holta, in the church park. Notodden Church was built in 1937–1938 with Fredrik Selmer as the lead builder. The new church was consecrated on 20 February 1938. The church has a basilica design with a nearly free-standing bell tower. There is a sacristy on the north side of the choir.

== See also ==
- List of churches in Agder og Telemark
