= Øvre Telemark District Court =

First-instance law court in Norway

- Øvre Telemark tingrett
- 59°33′28″N 9°15′09″E
- Established: 10 June 2025
- Jurisdiction: Øvre Telemark
- Location: Notodden and Kviteseid, Norway
- Coordinates: 59°33′28″N 9°15′09″E
- Appeals to: Agder Court of Appeal
- Website: Official website

Øvre Telemark District Court (Norwegian: Øvre Telemark tingrett) is a district court located in Telemark county, Norway. This court is based at two different courthouses which are located in Notodden and Kviteseid. The court is subordinate to the Agder Court of Appeal. The court serves the 10 municipalities in upper (inland) Telemark county.

- The courthouse in Kviteseid accepts cases from the municipalities of Fyresdal, Kviteseid, Nissedal, Seljord, Tokke, and Vinje.
- The courthouse in Notodden accepts cases from the municipalities of Hjartdal, Midt-Telemark, Notodden, and Tinn.

The court is led by a chief judge (sorenskriver) and several other judges. The court is a court of first instance. Its judicial duties are mainly to settle criminal cases and to resolve civil litigation as well as bankruptcy. The administration and registration tasks of the court include death registration, issuing certain certificates, performing duties of a notary public, and officiating civil wedding ceremonies. Cases from this court are heard by a combination of professional judges and lay judges.

== History ==
This court was established on 10 June 2025 after the old Telemark District Court was divided into two separate courts. The old Telemark District Court had jurisdiction over all of Telemark county and it had three courthouses in Kviteseid, Notodden, and Skien. When it was divided, the inland parts of the county with the courthouses in Kviteseid and Notodden became the new Øvre Telemark District Court and the coastal parts of the county became the new Nedre Telemark District Court, based in Skien.
