= Aust-Telemark District Court =

Former district court in Norway

- Aust-Telemark tingrett
- 59°33′28″N 9°15′09″E
- Established: 16 July 1920
- Dissolved: 26 April 2021
- Jurisdiction: Eastern Telemark
- Location: Notodden, Norway
- Coordinates: 59°33′28″N 9°15′09″E
- Appeals to: Agder Court of Appeal

Aust-Telemark District Court (Norwegian: Aust-Telemark tingrett) was a district court in Telemark county, Norway. The court was based in Notodden. The court existed until 2021. It had jurisdiction over the municipalities of Bø, Hjartdal, Notodden, Sauherad, and Tinn. Cases from this court could be appealed to Agder Court of Appeal.

The court was a court of first instance. Its judicial duties were mainly to settle criminal cases and to resolve civil litigation as well as bankruptcy. The administration and registration tasks of the court included death registration, issuing certain certificates, performing duties of a notary public, and officiating civil wedding ceremonies. Cases from this court were heard by a combination of professional judges and lay judges.

== History ==
=== Heddal District Court ===
On 16 July 1920, the new Heddal District Court was established when the municipalities of Notodden, Heddal, Hjartdal, Gransherad, and Hovin were removed from other courts to create this new court.

=== Tinn og Heddal District Court ===
On 21 May 1937, the nearby Tinn District Court was dissolved and merged into this court. At the same time, the court was renamed Tinn og Heddal District Court. This merger added the area of Tinn Municipality to the court's jurisdiction.

=== Aust-Telemark District Court ===
On 1 January 2007, the old Nedre Telemark District Court was closed and its geographical jurisdiction was divided between other neighboring courts. The areas of Bø Municipality and Sauherad Municipality were then added to the area of Tinn og Heddal District Court's jurisdiction. At the same time, the name of the court was changed to Aust-Telemark District Court.

On 26 April 2021, Aust-Telemark District Court was merged with the Vest-Telemark District Court and Nedre Telemark District Court to create the new Telemark District Court.
