= Olav Andresen =

Norwegian politician

- Born: 15 April 1877; Heddal Municipality, Norway
- Died: 1950 (aged 72–73)
- Occupation: Politician

Olav Andresen (15 April 1877 – 27 June 1950) was a Norwegian politician.

He was born in Heddal Municipality to Andres Johannessen and Ragnhild Amundsdatter. He served as mayor of Notodden Municipality 1922–1924, 1928–1931 and 1934–1940. He was elected representative to the Storting for the period 1925–1927, for the Labour Party.
