= Heddal (village) =

Village in Notodden Municipality, Norway

- Village
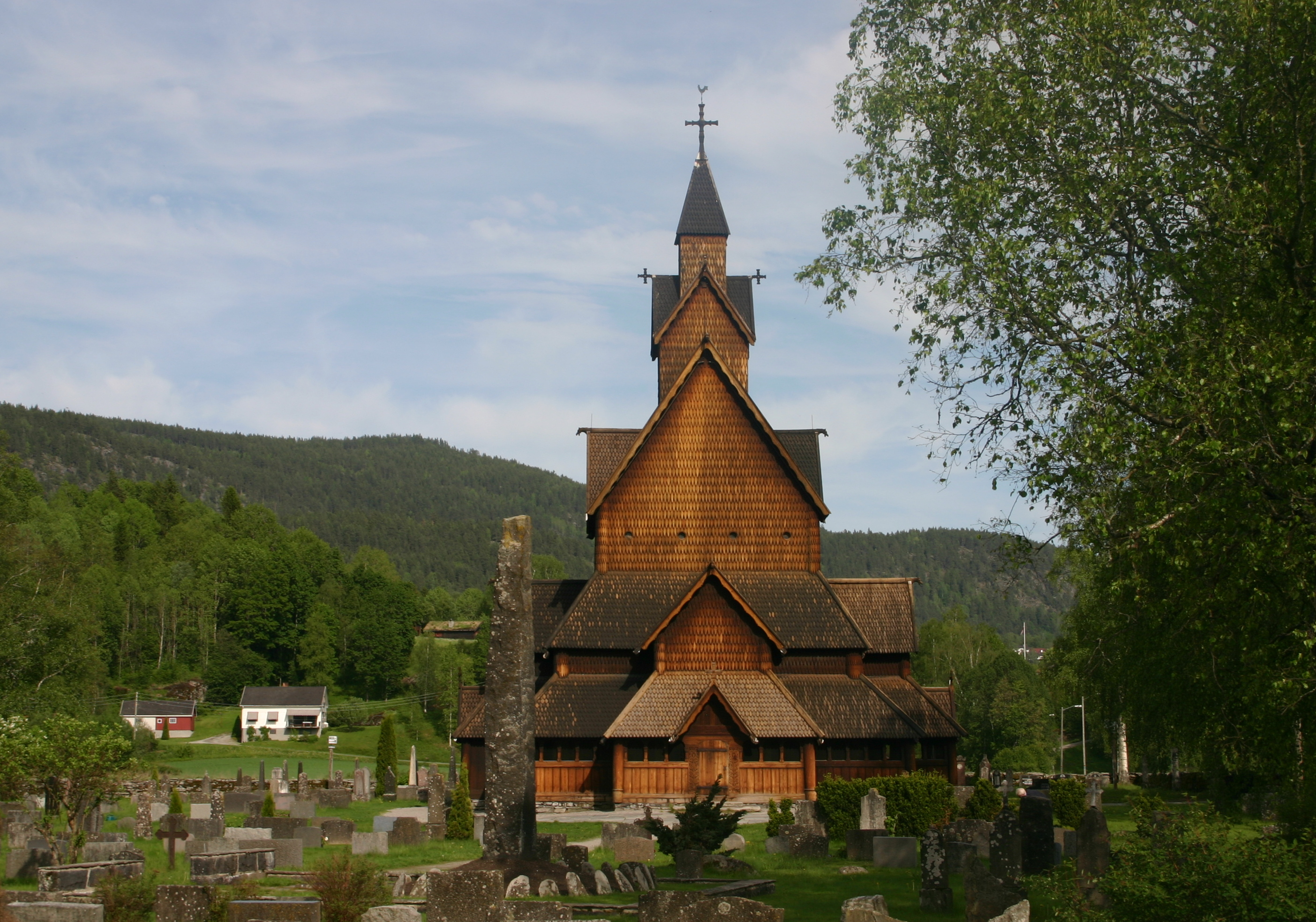
- View of the ancient church in the village
- Interactive map of Heddal
- Coordinates: 59.58745°N 9.1721°E
- Country: Norway
- Region: Eastern Norway
- County: Telemark
- District: Aust-Telemark
- Municipality: Notodden Municipality
- Elevation: 34 m (112 ft)
- Time zone: UTC+01:00 (CET)
  - Summer (DST): UTC+02:00 (CEST)
- Post Code: 3676 Notodden

Heddal is a village in Notodden Municipality in Telemark county, Norway. The village is located in the Heddalen valley, along the river Heddøla, about 7 kilometres (4.3 mi) to the east of the town of Notodden, about 3 kilometres (1.9 mi) northwest of the village of Yli, and about 13 kilometres (8.1 mi) to the southeast of the village of Sauland (in Hjartdal Municipality). The European route E134 highway runs through the village area.

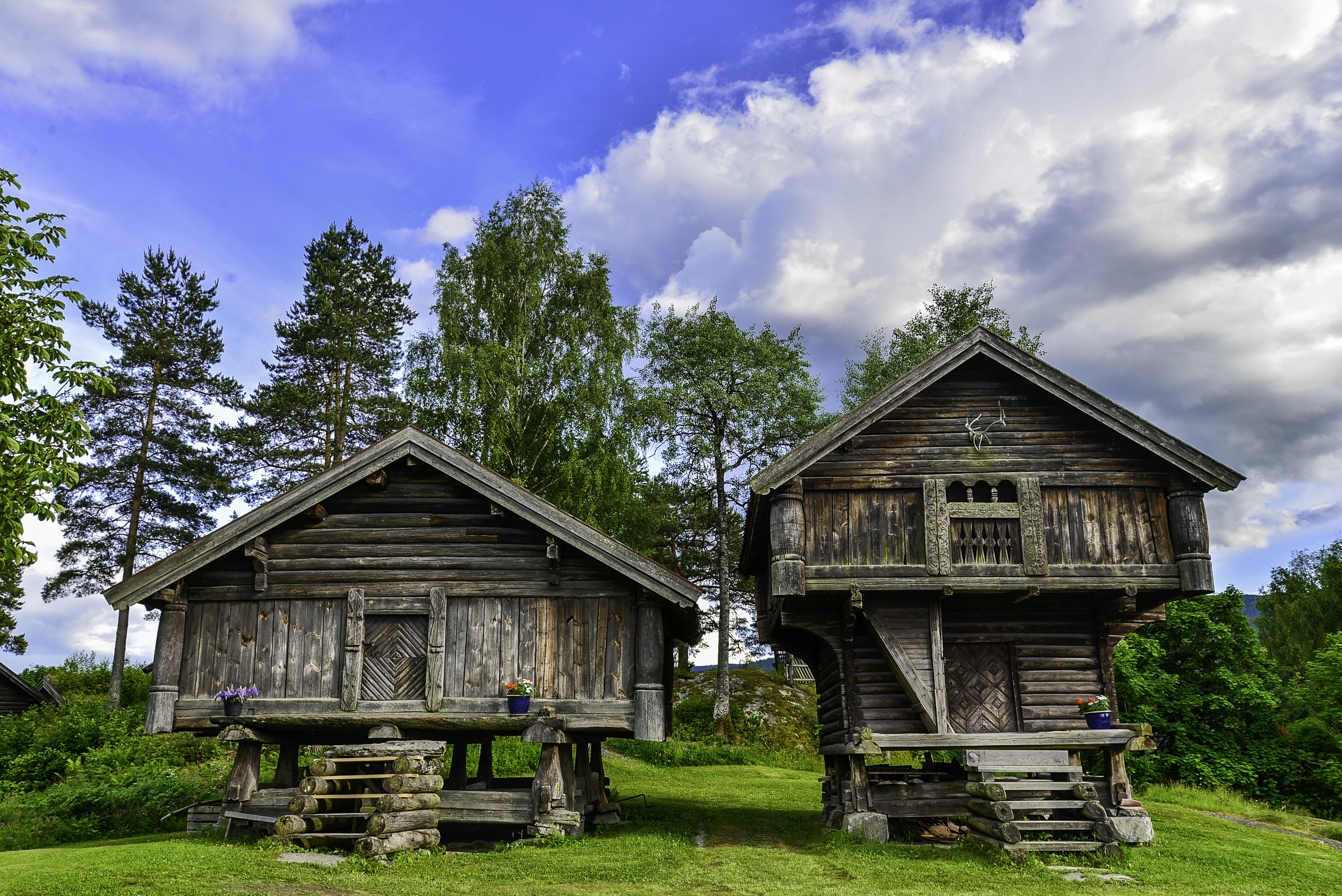
View of the local museum

The village is fairly rural with many farms spread throughout it. The historic Heddal Stave Church and the Heddal Open Air Museum are both located in the village, drawing many tourists to the area each year.

== History ==
The village was the administrative centre of the old Heddal Municipality which existed from 1838 until 1964.
