= Nedre Telemark District Court =

First-instance law court in Norway

- Nedre Telemark tingrett
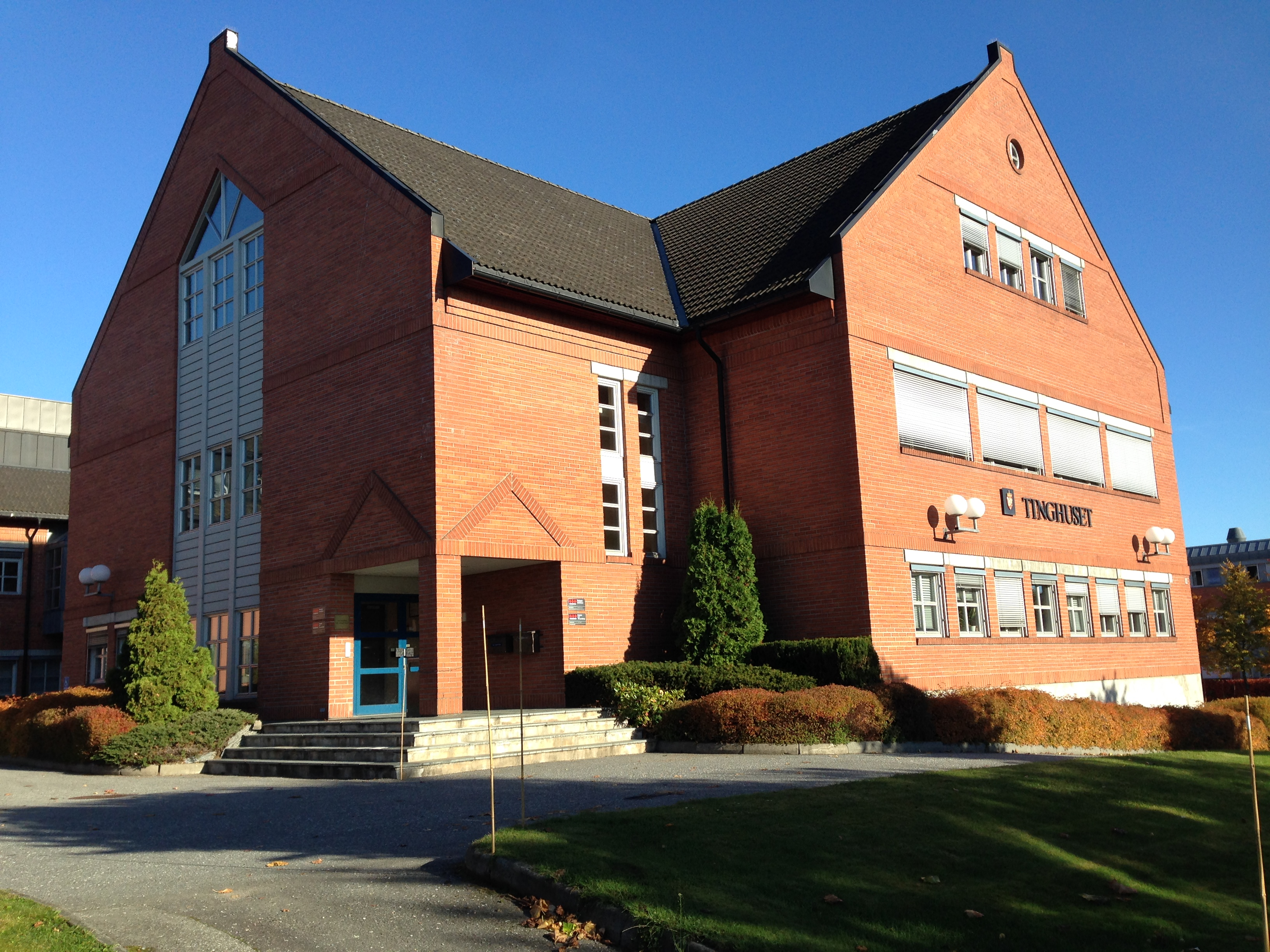
- The Courthouse of Skien
- 59°13′08″N 9°35′54″E
- Established: 10 June 2025
- Jurisdiction: Nedre Telemark
- Location: Skien, Norway
- Coordinates: 59°13′08″N 9°35′54″E
- Appeals to: Agder Court of Appeal
- Website: Official website

Nedre Telemark District Court (Norwegian: Nedre Telemark tingrett) is a district court located in Telemark county, Norway. This court is based in Skien. The court is subordinate to the Agder Court of Appeal. The court serves lower (coastal) Telemark county which includes the municipalities of Bamble, Drangedal, Kragerø, Nome, Porsgrunn, Siljan, and Skien.

The court is led by a chief judge (sorenskriver) and several other judges. The court is a court of first instance. Its judicial duties are mainly to settle criminal cases and to resolve civil litigation as well as bankruptcy. The administration and registration tasks of the court include death registration, issuing certain certificates, performing duties of a notary public, and officiating civil wedding ceremonies. Cases from this court are heard by a combination of professional judges and lay judges.

== History ==
There has been a Nedre Telemark District Court in various forms in Telemark county for a long time (since before 1714). Over time, the boundaries of its jurisdiction have changed. In 2007, the Nedre Telemark District Court included Nome Municipality, Porsgrunn Municipality, and Skien Municipality. On 26 April 2021, Nedre Telemark District Court was dissolved when it was merged with the old Aust-Telemark District Court and Vest-Telemark District Court to form the new Telemark District Court. The new district court system continued to use the courthouses from the predecessor courts.

The Nedre Telemark District Court was re-established on 10 June 2025 after the old Telemark District Court was divided into two separate courts. The old Telemark District Court had jurisdiction over all of Telemark county and it had three courthouses in Kviteseid, Notodden, and Skien. When it was divided, the inland parts of the county with the courthouses in Kviteseid and Notodden became the new Øvre Telemark District Court and the coastal parts of the county became the new Nedre Telemark District Court, based in Skien.
