= Hitterdal =

Hitterdal may refer to:

== Places ==
- Hitterdal, Minnesota, a city in Clay County, Minnesota, United States
- Hitterdalen, a village in Røros Municipality in Trøndelag county, Norway
- Hitterdal Chapel, a parish church in Røros Municipality in Trøndelag county, Norway
- Hitterdal Municipality, a former municipality now part of Notodden Municipality in Telemark county, Norway

== See also ==
- Hítardalur
