= Heddal Stave Church =

Church in Telemark, Norway

- Heddal stavkyrkje
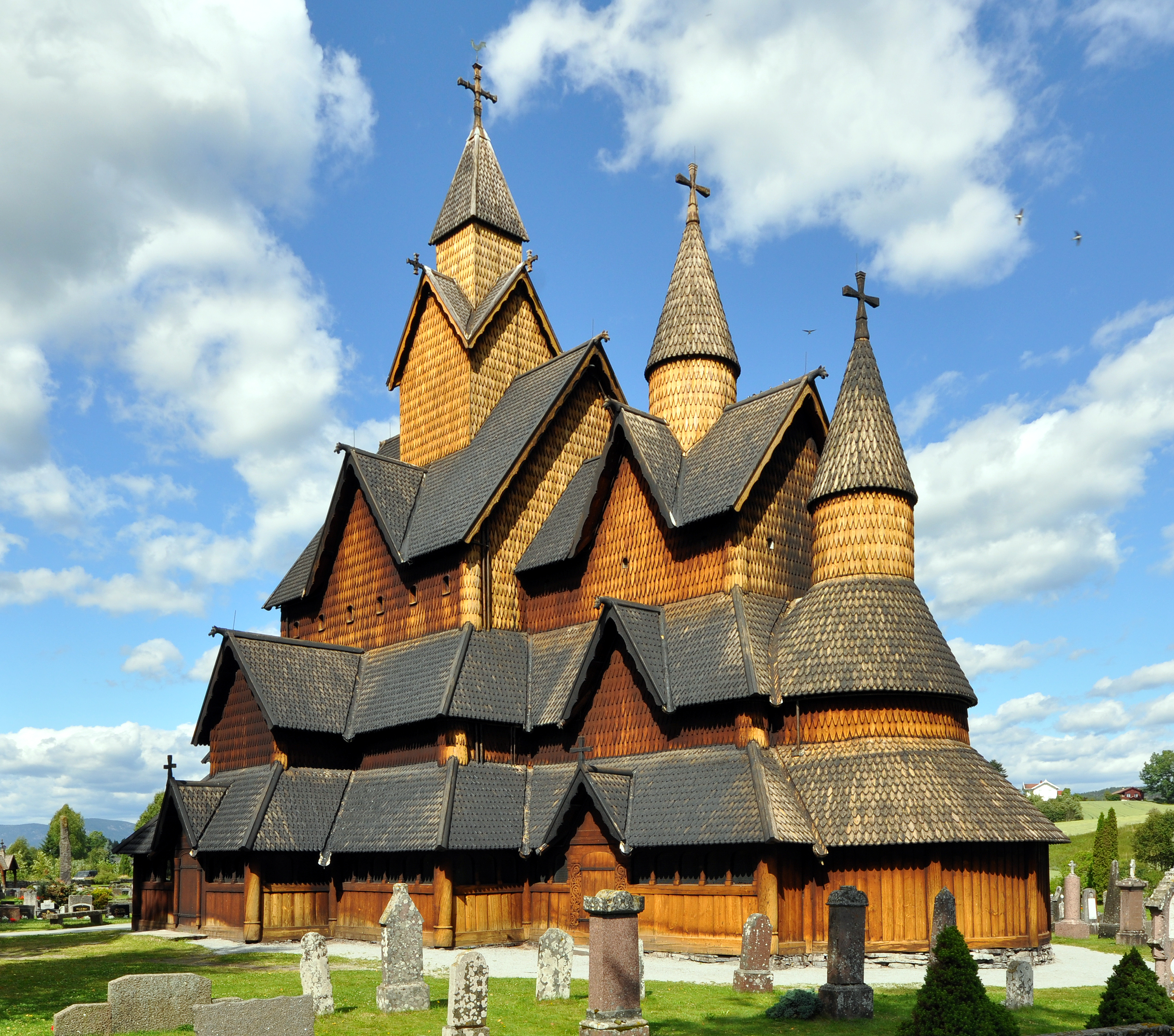
- View of the Heddal Stave Church (Norway's largest stave church)
- Heddal Stave Church
- 59°34′46″N 9°10′34″E
- Location: Notodden Municipality, Telemark
- Country: Norway
- Denomination: Church of Norway
- Previous denomination: Catholic Church
- Churchmanship: Evangelical Lutheran

History
- Status: Parish church
- Founded: c. 1200
- Consecrated: 25 October (year unknown)

Architecture
- Functional status: Active
- Architectural type: Long church
- Completed: c. 1200 (826 years ago)

Specifications
- Capacity: 180
- Materials: Wood

Administration
- Diocese: Agder og Telemark
- Deanery: Øvre Telemark prosti
- Parish: Heddal
- Norwegian Cultural Heritage Site
- Type: Church
- Status: Automatically protected
- ID: 84513

Heddal Stave Church (Bokmål: Heddal stavkirke, Nynorsk: Heddal stavkyrkje) is a parish church of the Church of Norway in Notodden Municipality in Telemark county, Norway. It is located in the village of Heddal. It is the church for the Heddal parish which is part of the Øvre Telemark prosti in the Diocese of Agder og Telemark. The wooden, triple nave stave church was built in a long church design around the year 1200 using plans drawn up by an unknown architect. The church seats about 180 people.

The church is one of the 28 surviving stave churches in Norway and it is considered to be the largest of the stave churches. It was constructed entirely out of wood at the beginning of the 13th century, and it was dedicated to the Virgin Mary. After the Reformation, the church was in very poor condition. A major restoration of the building took place during 1849–1851. However, because the restorers lacked the necessary knowledge and skills, another restoration was required in the 1950s. The interior was marked by the period after the Reformation in 1536–1537 and is for a great part a result of the restoration that took place in the 1950s.

Heddal Stave Church is a popular tourist attraction, and it is open to the public during the summer season. The church is still in use, and remains a popular place to get married. In the 19th century, it became one of the first stave churches to be featured in a scholarly publication, described and depicted in one of Johannes Flintoe's illustrations.

== Architecture ==
Made from Scots pine wood, Heddal Stave Church is supported by load-bearing staves (wooden poles) and sits on a foundation of stone. To strengthen its massive structure, interior staves are alternated between short ones versus full-length ones. As a hybrid church, Heddal's nave resembles both Borgund style churches with their towering central plan, as well as the Kaupanger group's long arcaded naves: as seen in Heddal's chancel, which has six free masts. Although the chancel remains, its pillars were removed along with their inscribed texts.

Outside of the church's façade were doorways with ribbon-interlaced portals, four of which remain fairly intact. However, one of these portals no longer exists; only a line drawing remains depicting it. Initially, these portals acted as a thematic separation between the inside, which resembles the beginning of Christianity, versus the outside, recalling the end of paganism. Unlike the facades of older stave churches, which have pagan dragons occupying higher position than their Christian counterpart, Heddal employs Christian symbols at a more elevated level since it was built after Christianity's influence had spread throughout Norway.

Typically, inside the structure, between the months of October and May, the church is heated to around 5 °C (41 °F) using a continuous mild heating process for conservation purposes. On the interior of the church's chancel and nave were found the remainders of medieval wall paintings, overpainted with 17th century décor. By 2008–2010, the distempered paintings were refurbished to their original medieval designs, similar in style to those in the Torpo Stave Church, showing a connection between their figurative and decorative forms. Although a more thorough survey of the church's archeological site has not yet been conducted, notwithstanding its uprooting and restorations, there may still be remnants of its original cultural layers beneath the cathedral.

== History ==
The earliest existing historical records of the church date back to the year 1315, but that is not the year of construction. There is a lot of uncertainty about the origins of the church. Historical records vary with dates ranging from 1147 up to the 1300s. Dendrochronological dating showed rather uncertain results, but they date the church to between 1086 and 1196, but the samples were not complete, so the dates may not be accurate. There are also some runic inscriptions in the choir of the church that could be interpreted to say that the chancel was built in 1167 and it functioned as the church until the nave was built about 95 years later during the mid-13th century. Another theory is that there was an older church on the same site that was replaced in the 13th century and the new building reused some of the wood from the previous building. The prevailing theories generally say the church was likely built some time around the year 1200. When the church was first built it was known as the Hitterdal Church or Ryen Church in Hitterdal, using the old name for Heddal and the local farm, Ryen.

The church fell into serious disrepair after the Reformation. The church had some renovations during the 17th century to fix the building as well as add a flat ceiling inside the church. In 1723, the church was sold during the Norwegian church sale when the King sold the churches in Norway to pay off debts from the Great Northern War. The church was then owned by a private owner who was responsible for the upkeep of the building.

In 1814, this church served as an election church (Norwegian: valgkirke). Together with more than 300 other parish churches across Norway, it was a polling station for elections to the 1814 Norwegian Constituent Assembly which wrote the Constitution of Norway. This was Norway's first national elections. Each church parish was a constituency that elected people called "electors" who later met together in each county to elect the representatives for the assembly that was to meet at Eidsvoll Manor later that year.

By the mid-1800s, the church was in seriously bad shape and a major renovation was planned. In 1848–1851, the church was rebuilt using designs by Johan Henrik Nebelong. This rebuilding was strongly criticized afterwards. This was one of the first major restorations of a medieval building and there was little experience with and understanding of the construction of stave churches among architects in general and from the newly started Society for the Preservation of Ancient Norwegian Monuments, which approved the plans. After the rebuilding, the interior appeared in a distinctly empire style, and there were sometimes major construction engineering problems due to moisture and fungal damage.

Just over a century later in the 1950s, Nebelong's changes were undone and the church was restored to look more like it originally did. This restoration was led by Gudolf Blakstad and Herman Munthe-Kaas. The changes were quite drastic and they also included a lot of structural repairs including the replacement of many of the old staves. The nave's four corner staves and the half-plank walls are still original, but the foundations, sleepers, and stave beds were all replaced. Large parts of the nave are made of new materials (only two of the intermediate staves and some arch knees are original). Also, the roof structure got its current design during this restoration.

The old stave church does not have a built in heating system, and large fluctuations in temperature are not good for the centuries-old timbers. Since the old stave church is still a functioning parish church, it had been used year-round. In 1993, the old barn on the grounds of the vicarage was rebuilt so that it could be used as the church during the winters. The barn "church" was named the Låvekirken and it houses the parish offices and has a large meeting space for the congregation in the winter. The old stave church is used when the weather is nice and the building is now only heated to a maximum of 8 °C (46 °F).

=== Legend ===
There is a legend telling about the construction of the church and how it was built in three days. Five farmers (Raud Rygi, Stebbe Straand, Kjeik Sem, Grut Grene and Vrang Stivi) from Heddal had made plans for a church, and they decided to have it built.

One day, Raud Rygi (one of the five men) met a stranger who was willing to build the church. However, the stranger, set three conditions for doing the job, one of which must be fulfilled before the church was finished. Raud had three options: fetch the sun and the moon from the sky, forfeit his life-blood, or guess the name of the stranger.

Raud thought the last would not prove too difficult, so he agreed to the terms, but time began to run out. All of the building materials had arrived during the first night, and remarkably, the spire was built during the second. It became clear to Raud that the church would be finished on the third day. Down at heart and fearing for his life, Raud took a walk around in the fields trying to figure out what the stranger's name could be. Still wandering about he had unconsciously arrived at Svintruberget (a rocky hill southeast of the church site) when he suddenly heard a strange but most beautiful and clearly audible female song:

English	Norwegian
Tomorrow Finn will bring us the Moon. Where he goes, the sun and Christian blood perish. He brings children to song and play. But now my children, sleep safe and sound.	I morgen kommer Finn og bringer oss maanen der han kommer forgaar sol og kristenblod lokker barna til sang og spel men nå mine små, sov stille og vel

Now Raud knew what to do, as the stranger was a mountain troll. As expected, the stranger visited Raud the next day, to present the church. Together they walk over to the church, and Raud walks up to one of the pillars, hugs it as if to straighten it, and says, "Hey Finn, this pillar isn't straight!" Finn snaps back, "I could be even more bent!" and then hastily leaves the church. Raud had solved the riddle after all. The stranger's name was Finn and he lived in the Svintru Mountain. Finn, also known as Finn Fairhair or Finn Fagerlokk, a troll, could not ever after stand the sound of church bells, so he moved along with his family to Himing (Lifjell).

According to the legend, the same troll was also responsible for building Nidaros Cathedral, Avaldsnes Church, and Lund Cathedral.

== Media gallery ==
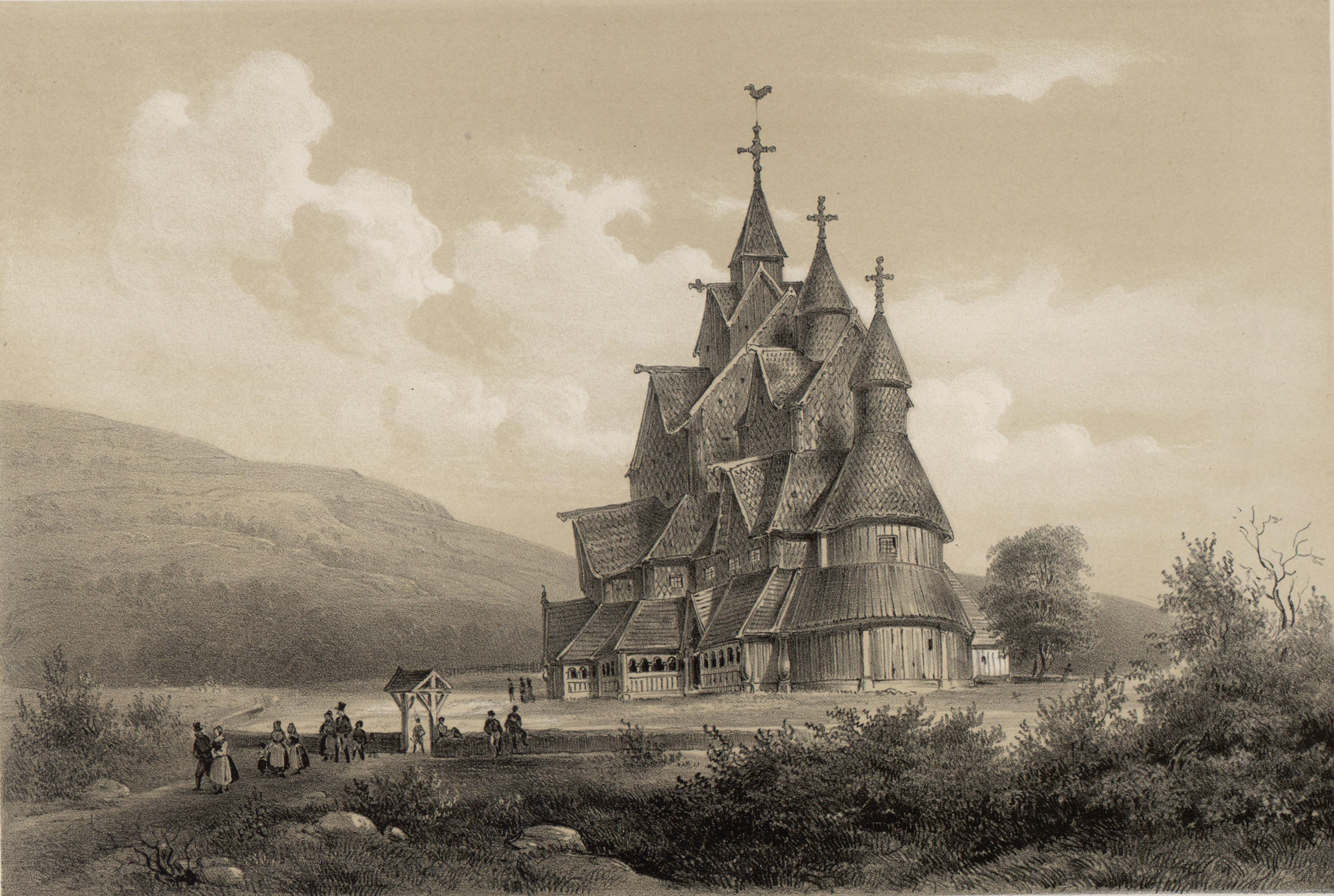
Illustration from "Norge fremstillet i Tegninger", 1848

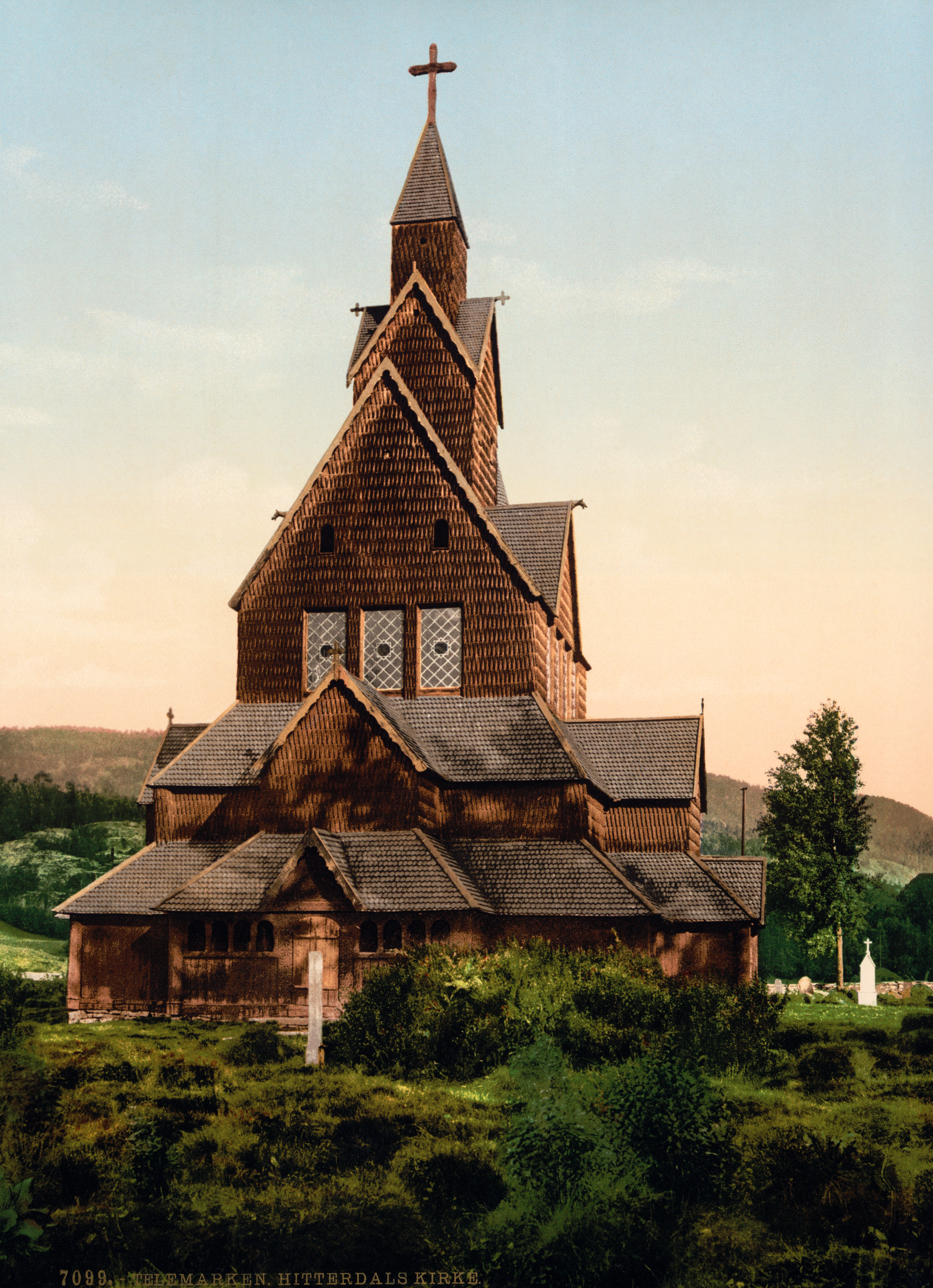
Heddal Stave Church, sometime between 1890 and 1900

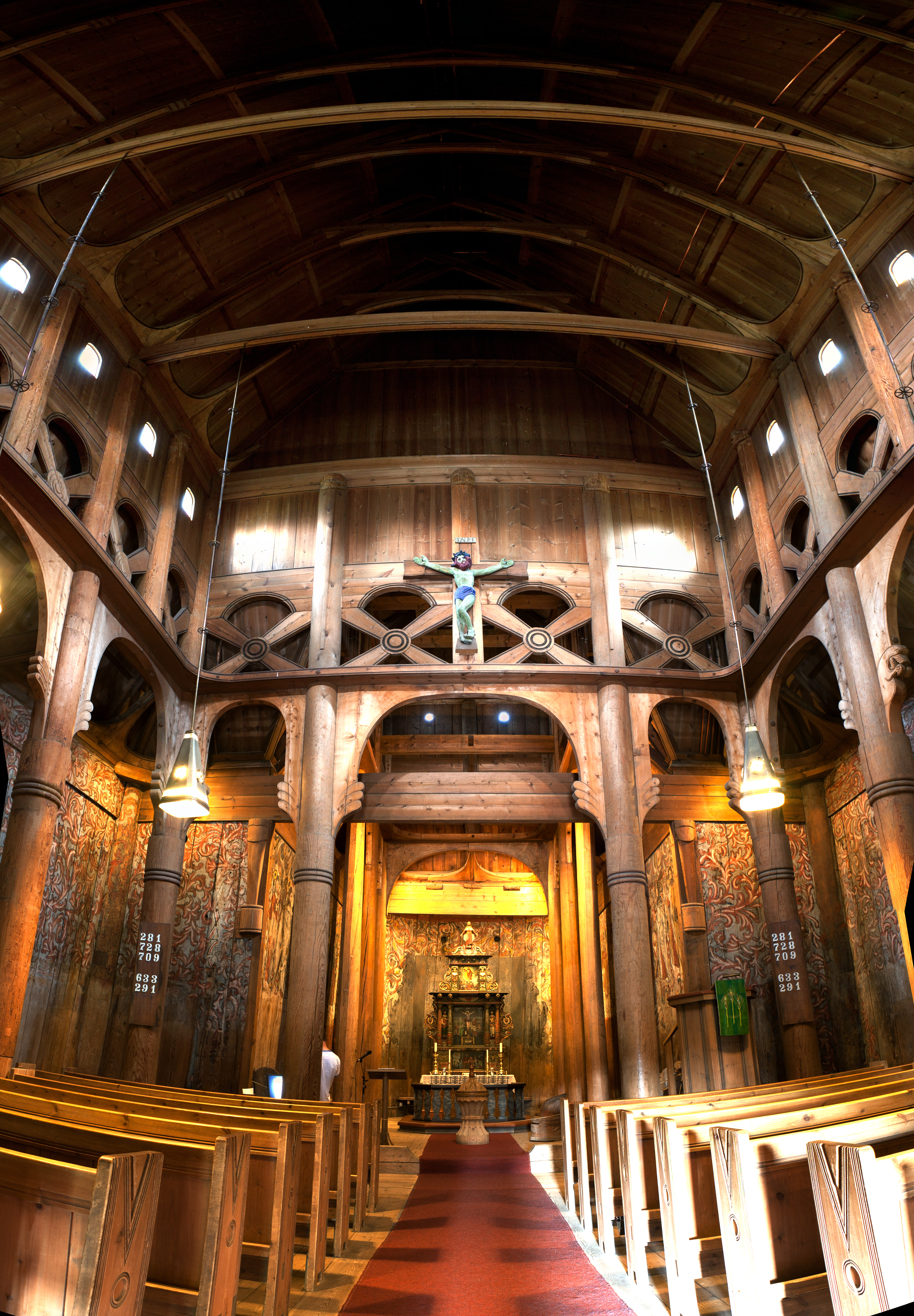
Interior of Heddal Stave Church

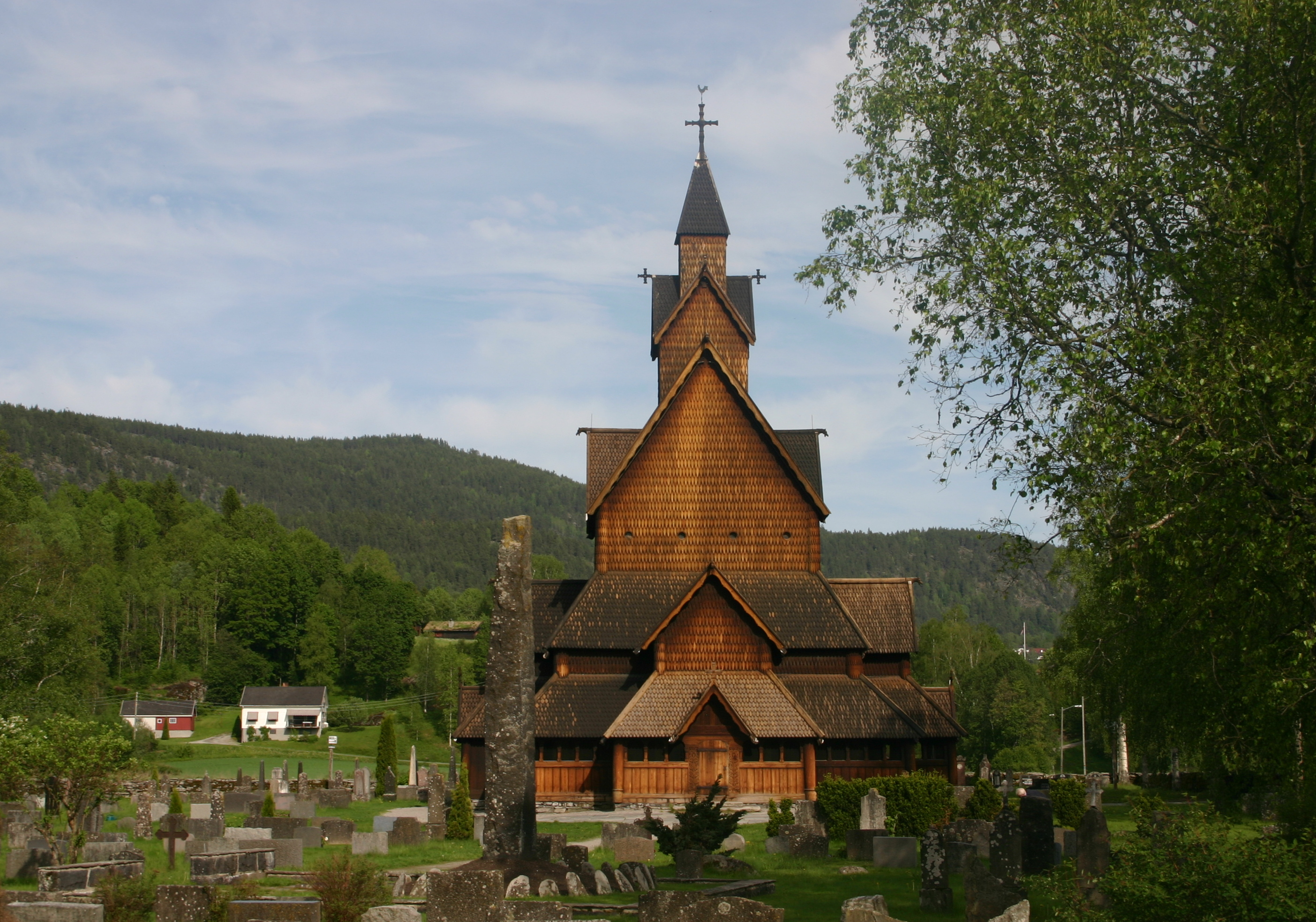
Rear view

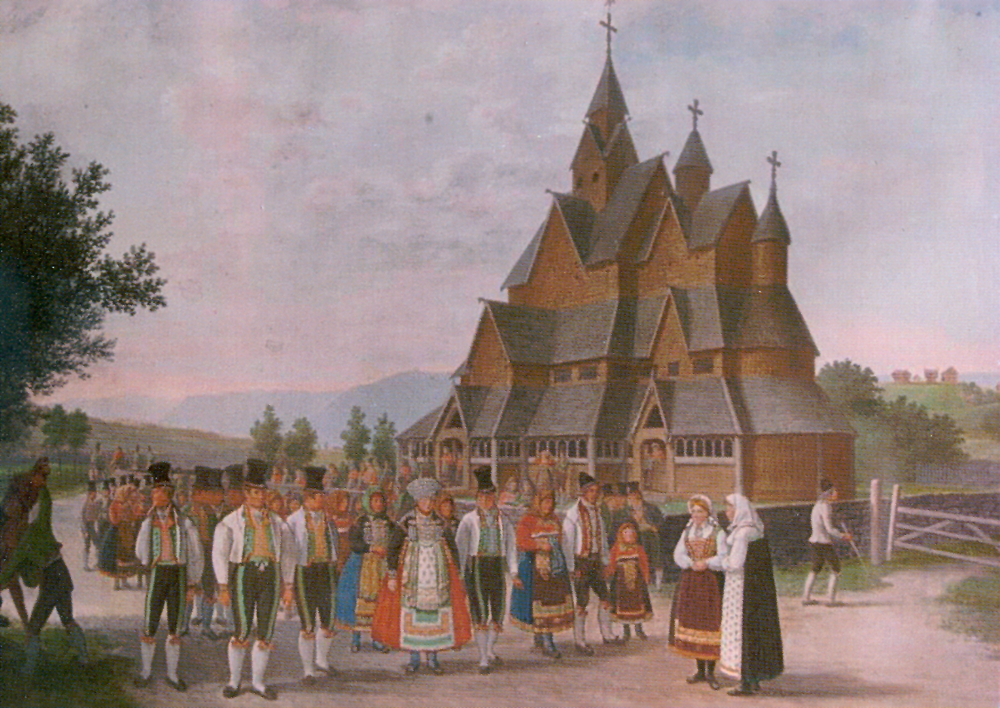
Heddal Stave church by Johannes Flintoe, 1828

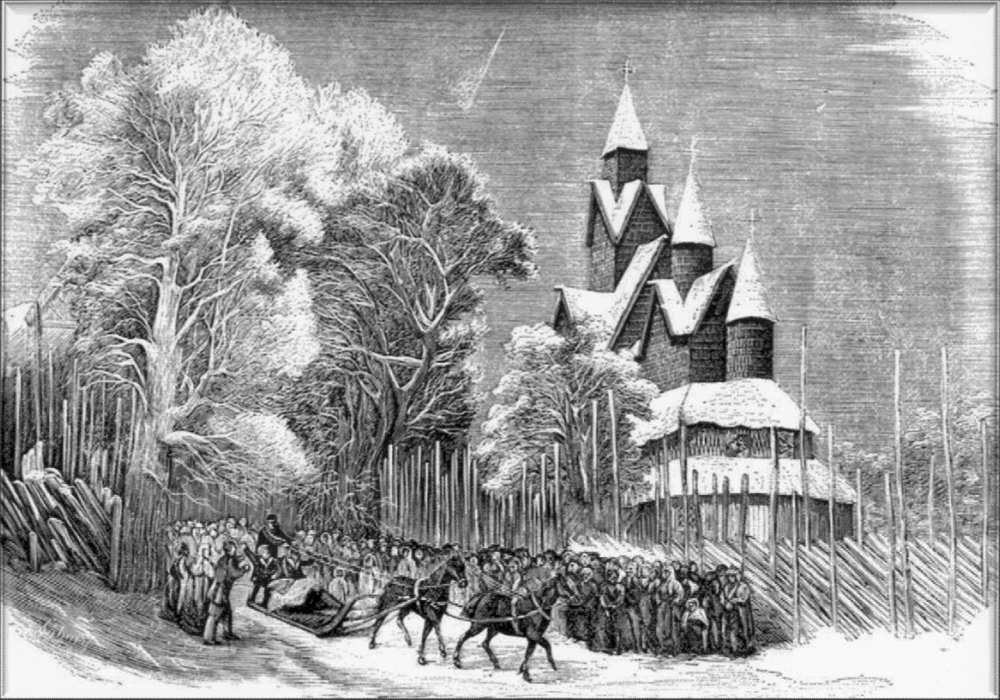
Painting in Le Monde Illustré, 1871

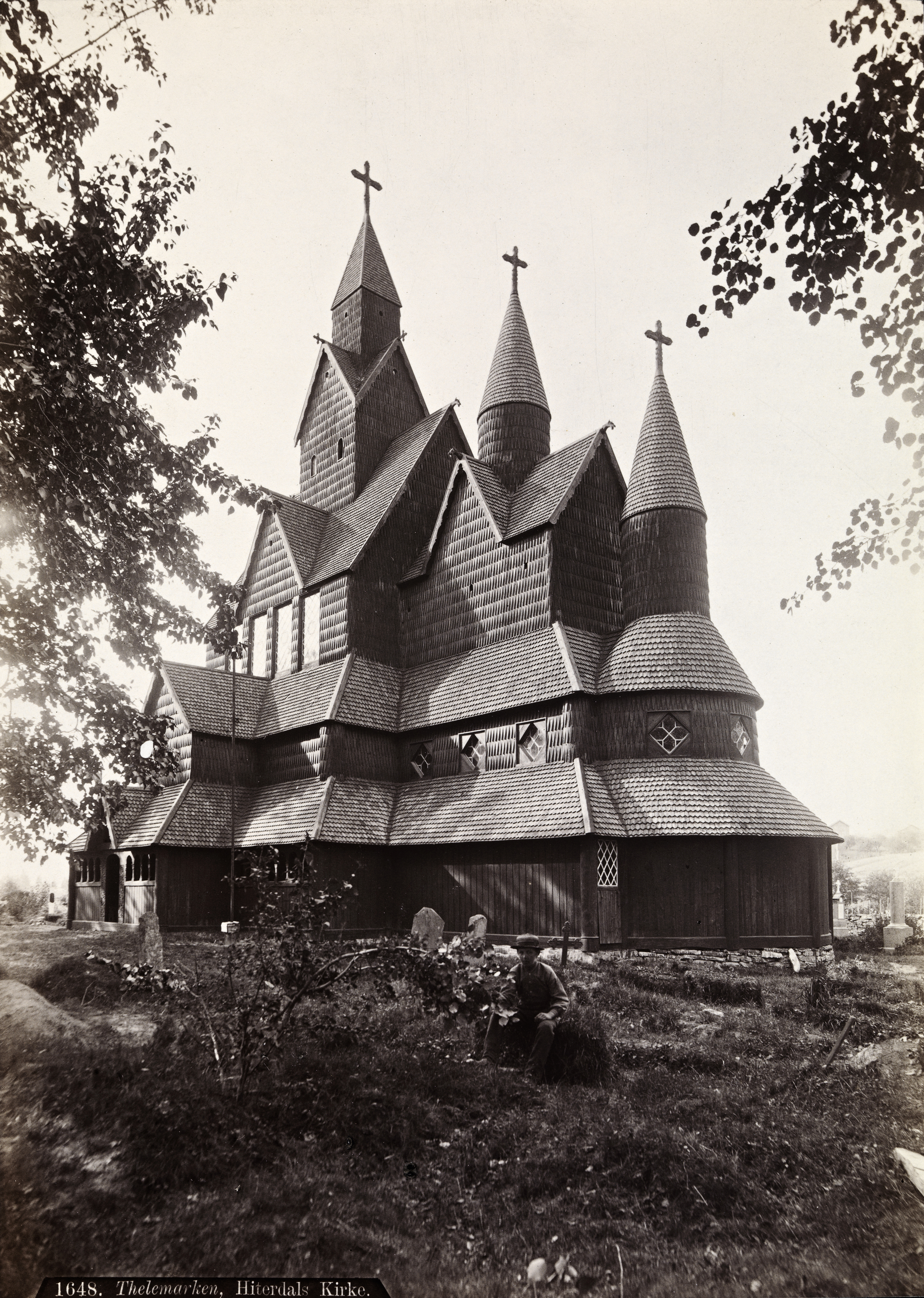
Photo by Axel Lindahl, 1880–1890

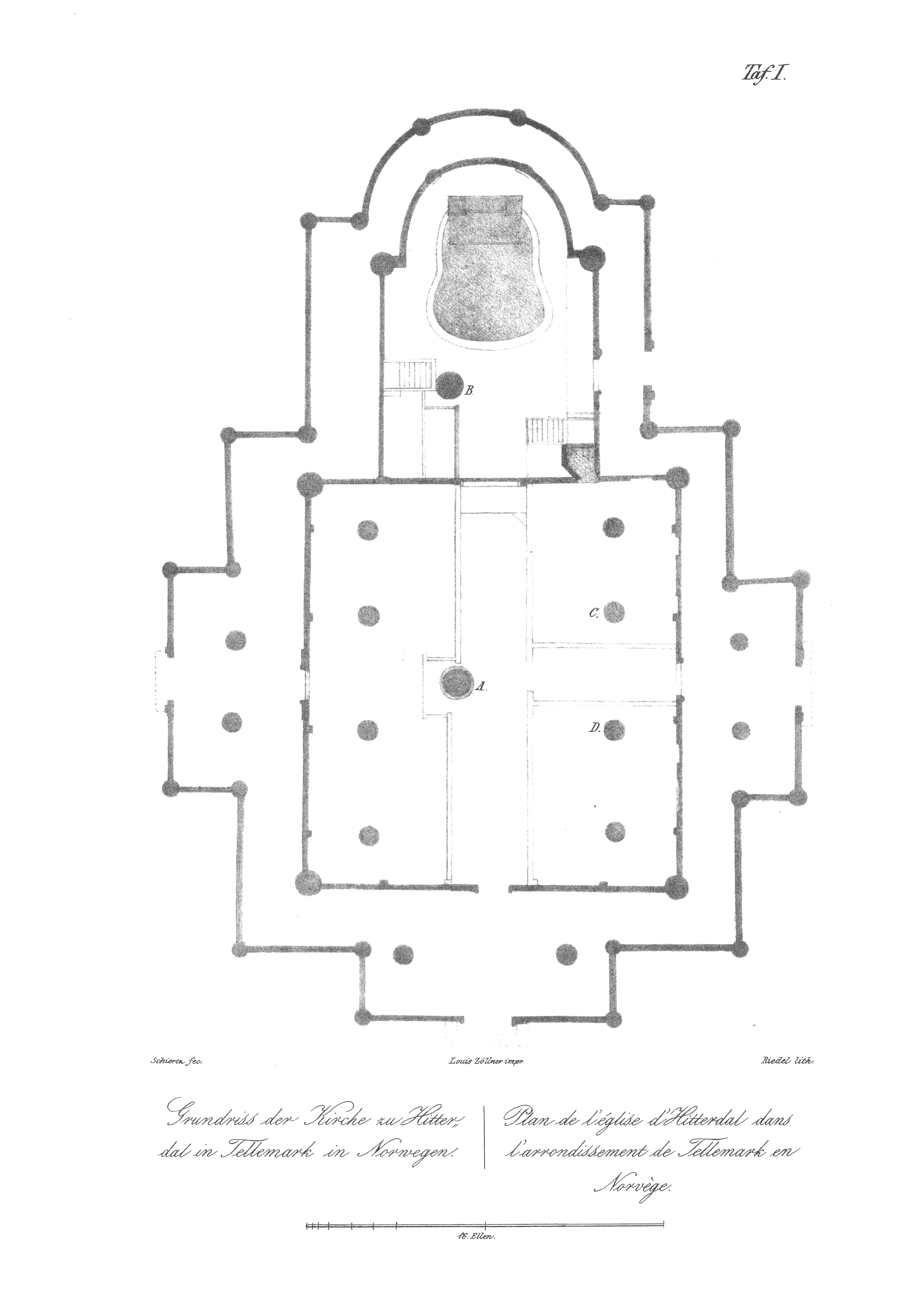
Plan of the church, 1837

== See also ==
- List of churches in Agder og Telemark
