= Notodden Municipality =

Municipality in Telemark, Norway

Notodden Municipality Notodden kommune
- Municipality
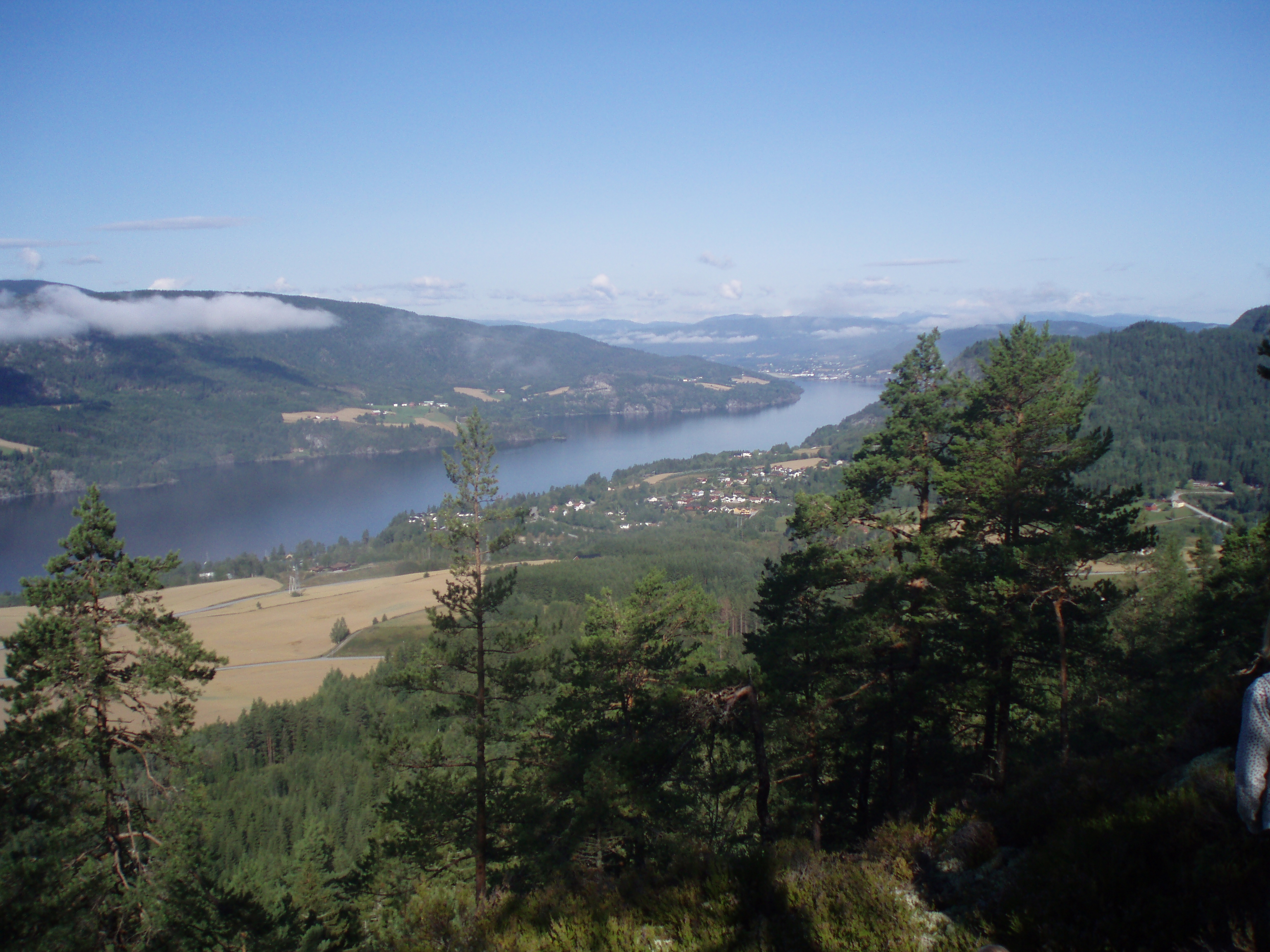

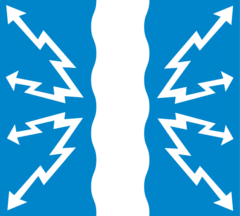
- Flag Coat of arms

- Telemark within Norway

- Notodden within Telemark
- Coordinates: 59°37′46″N 9°11′29″E
- Country: Norway
- County: Telemark
- District: Aust-Telemark
- Established: 1 Jan 1913
  - Preceded by: Heddal Municipality
- Administrative centre: Notodden

Government
  - Mayor (2015): Gry Bløchlinger (Ap)

Area
  - Total: 983.88 km^{2} (379.88 sq mi)
  - Land: 912.01 km^{2} (352.13 sq mi)
  - Water: 71.87 km^{2} (27.75 sq mi) 7.3%
  - Rank: #118 in Norway
- Highest elevation: 1,306.04 m (4,284.9 ft)

Population (2026)
  - Total: 13,389
  - Rank: #93 in Norway
  - Density: 14.7/km^{2} (38/sq mi)
  - Change (10 years): ▲ +5.3%
- Demonym: Notodding

Official language
  - Norwegian form: Neutral
- Time zone: UTC+01:00 (CET)
  - Summer (DST): UTC+02:00 (CEST)
- ISO 3166 code: NO-4005
- Website: Official website

UNESCO World Heritage Site
- Official name: Rjukan–Notodden Industrial Heritage Site
- Criteria: Cultural: ii, iv
- Reference: 1486
- Inscription: 2015 (39th Session)
- Area: 4,959.5 hectares (19.1 mi^{2})
- Buffer zone: 33,967.6 ha (131.1 mi^{2})

Notodden (Norwegian: [ˈnuːtˌɔdːən]; locally [ˈnuːtˌɔɖːɳ]) is a municipality in Telemark county, Norway. It is located in the traditional district of Aust-Telemark within the larger Øvre Telemark region. The administrative centre of the municipality is the town of Notodden. Other population centres include the villages of Bolkesjø, Gransherad, Heddal, Hjuksebø, Hjuksevelta, Rudsgrendi, Tinnoset, and Yli.

The 983.88-square-kilometre (379.88 sq mi) municipality is the 118th largest by area out of the 357 municipalities in Norway. Notodden Municipality is the 93rd most populous municipality in Norway with a population of 13,389. The municipality's population density is 14.7 inhabitants per square kilometre (38/sq mi) and its population has increased by 5.3% over the previous 10-year period.

Norway's largest stave church, Heddal Stave Church, is located in the village of Heddal, a few kilometres west the town of Notodden. Notodden Airport, is located west of the town, along the European route E134 highway. Norsk Hydro was founded in this town. Notodden Municipality is well known for the annual Notodden Blues Festival, which is considered one of the best blues festivals in Europe. It also has a well-known metal festival called Motstøy Festivalen. The football club Notodden FK is headquartered here.

== General information ==
=== Administrative history ===
The formannskapsdistrikt law of 1837 created a system of local government in Norway by establishing each town (ladested or kjøpstad) and each Church of Norway prestegjeld as a civil municipality. On 1 January 1913, the newly-designated kjøpstad (town) of Notodden was separated from Heddal Municipality and established as Notodden Municipality (population: 4,821). The new municipality was an enclave within Heddal Municipality (which now had a population of 2,890).

During the 1960s, there were many municipal mergers across Norway due to the work of the Schei Committee. On 1 January 1964, the following areas were merged to form an enlarged Notodden Municipality:

- all of Notodden Municipality (population: 7,523)
- all of Heddal Municipality (population: 4,844)
- most of Gransherad Municipality (population: 1,115), except for the upper Jondalen valley area which became part of Kongsberg Municipality in Buskerud county
- the Rudsgrendi area of Hovin Municipality (population: 21)

In 2020, there were many municipal and county mergers across Norway due to the work of the Solberg cabinet. Historically, this municipality was part of Telemark county. On 1 January 2020, the municipality became a part of the newly-formed Vestfold og Telemark county (after Telemark and Vestfold counties were merged). The merger was shortlived, and on 1 January 2024, the merger was undone and this municipality became part of Telemark county once again.

=== Name ===
The municipality (and town of Notodden) is named after a small cotter's farmstead (husmannsplass) located on the old Tinne farm since this was the original site of the town (near the mouth of the river Tinnelva at the lake Heddalsvatnet). The first element is derived from the word nót which means "to fish using a seine". The last element is the definite singular form of odde which means "headland". Thus it is a "headland for net fishing".

=== Coat of arms ===
The coat of arms was granted on 11 August 1939. The official blazon is "Azure, a pale wavy and four lightning bolts in saltire argent" (Norwegian: På blå bunn en loddrett sølvelv som sender lynstråler av sølv til begge sider). This means the arms have a blue field (background) and the charge is a wavy vertical bar and four lightning bolts emanating from the centre and making an X-shape. The charge has a tincture of argent which means it is commonly colored white, but if it is made out of metal, then silver is used. The design symbolizes that Notodden was created by the exploitation of hydroelectric power on the river Tinnelva when Norsk Hydro started its operations with saltpeter production and power development in 1905. The vertical bar represents the Tinnfoss waterfall along the river and the lightning bolts represent electricity. The arms were designed by Jens Høibø. The municipal flag has the same design as the coat of arms.

=== Churches ===
The Church of Norway has four parishes (sokn) within Notodden Municipality. It is part of the Øvre Telemark prosti (deanery) in the Diocese of Agder og Telemark.

Churches in Notodden Municipality
Parish (sokn)	Church name	Location of the church	Year built
Gransherad	Gransherad Church	Gransherad	1849
Heddal	Heddal Stave Church	Heddal	1200s
Lisleherad	Lisleherad Church	Landsverk	1873
Notodden	Notodden Church	Notodden	1938

== Government ==
Notodden Municipality is responsible for primary education (through 10th grade), outpatient health services, senior citizen services, welfare and other social services, zoning, economic development, and municipal roads and utilities. The municipality is governed by a municipal council of directly elected representatives. The mayor is indirectly elected by a vote of the municipal council. The municipality is under the jurisdiction of the Øvre Telemark District Court and the Agder Court of Appeal.

=== Municipal council ===
The municipal council (Kommunestyre) of Notodden Municipality is made up of 41 representatives that are elected to four-year terms. The tables below show the current and historical composition of the council by political party.

Notodden kommunestyre 2023–2027
Party name (in Norwegian)	Number of representatives
Labour Party (Arbeiderpartiet)	13
Progress Party (Fremskrittspartiet)	5
Conservative Party (Høyre)	8
Christian Democratic Party (Kristelig Folkeparti)	3
Red Party (Rødt)	4
Centre Party (Senterpartiet)	4
Socialist Left Party (Sosialistisk Venstreparti)	2
Liberal Party (Venstre)	2
Total number of members:	41

Notodden kommunestyre 2019–2023
Party name (in Norwegian)	Number of representatives
Labour Party (Arbeiderpartiet)	14
Progress Party (Fremskrittspartiet)	2
Green Party (Miljøpartiet De Grønne)	1
Conservative Party (Høyre)	7
The Christians Party (Partiet De Kristne)	1
Christian Democratic Party (Kristelig Folkeparti)	3
Red Party (Rødt)	3
Centre Party (Senterpartiet)	6
Socialist Left Party (Sosialistisk Venstreparti)	3
Liberal Party (Venstre)	1
Total number of members:	41

Notodden kommunestyre 2015–2019
Party name (in Norwegian)	Number of representatives
Labour Party (Arbeiderpartiet)	14
Progress Party (Fremskrittspartiet)	2
Green Party (Miljøpartiet De Grønne)	1
Conservative Party (Høyre)	11
Christian Democratic Party (Kristelig Folkeparti)	3
Red Party (Rødt)	2
Centre Party (Senterpartiet)	4
Socialist Left Party (Sosialistisk Venstreparti)	2
Liberal Party (Venstre)	2
Total number of members:	41

Notodden kommunestyre 2011–2015
Party name (in Norwegian)	Number of representatives
Labour Party (Arbeiderpartiet)	13
Progress Party (Fremskrittspartiet)	4
Conservative Party (Høyre)	8
Christian Democratic Party (Kristelig Folkeparti)	5
Centre Party (Senterpartiet)	2
Liberal Party (Venstre)	4
Joint list of the Red Party (Rødt) and the Socialist Left Party (Sosialistisk Venstreparti)	5
Total number of members:	41

Notodden kommunestyre 2007–2011
Party name (in Norwegian)	Number of representatives
Labour Party (Arbeiderpartiet)	11
Progress Party (Fremskrittspartiet)	6
Conservative Party (Høyre)	4
Christian Democratic Party (Kristelig Folkeparti)	4
Centre Party (Senterpartiet)	3
Liberal Party (Venstre)	2
Joint list of the Red Party (Rødt) and the Socialist Left Party (Sosialistisk Venstreparti)	11
Total number of members:	41

Notodden kommunestyre 2003–2007
Party name (in Norwegian)	Number of representatives
Labour Party (Arbeiderpartiet)	14
Progress Party (Fremskrittspartiet)	7
Conservative Party (Høyre)	3
Christian Democratic Party (Kristelig Folkeparti)	4
Centre Party (Senterpartiet)	5
Liberal Party (Venstre)	1
Joint list of the Red Party (Rødt) and the Socialist Left Party (Sosialistisk Venstreparti)	7
Total number of members:	41

Notodden kommunestyre 1999–2003
Party name (in Norwegian)	Number of representatives
Labour Party (Arbeiderpartiet)	16
Progress Party (Fremskrittspartiet)	4
Conservative Party (Høyre)	4
Christian Democratic Party (Kristelig Folkeparti)	6
Centre Party (Senterpartiet)	4
Liberal Party (Venstre)	1
Joint list of the Red Party (Rødt) and the Socialist Left Party (Sosialistisk Venstreparti)	6
Total number of members:	41

Notodden kommunestyre 1995–1999
Party name (in Norwegian)	Number of representatives
Labour Party (Arbeiderpartiet)	12
Progress Party (Fremskrittspartiet)	6
Conservative Party (Høyre)	3
Christian Democratic Party (Kristelig Folkeparti)	5
Centre Party (Senterpartiet)	5
Liberal Party (Venstre)	1
Joint list of the Red Party (Rødt) and the Socialist Left Party (Sosialistisk Venstreparti)	9
Total number of members:	41

Notodden kommunestyre 1991–1995
Party name (in Norwegian)	Number of representatives
Labour Party (Arbeiderpartiet)	14
Progress Party (Fremskrittspartiet)	1
Red Electoral Alliance (Rød Valgallianse)	3
Socialist Left Party (Sosialistisk Venstreparti)	5
Cross-party Cooperation List (Tverrpolitisk Samarbeidslist)	30
Total number of members:	53

Notodden kommunestyre 1987–1991
Party name (in Norwegian)	Number of representatives
Labour Party (Arbeiderpartiet)	27
Progress Party (Fremskrittspartiet)	5
Conservative Party (Høyre)	7
Christian Democratic Party (Kristelig Folkeparti)	5
Red Electoral Alliance (Rød Valgallianse)	2
Centre Party (Senterpartiet)	2
Socialist Left Party (Sosialistisk Venstreparti)	3
Liberal Party (Venstre)	2
Total number of members:	53

Notodden kommunestyre 1983–1987
Party name (in Norwegian)	Number of representatives
Labour Party (Arbeiderpartiet)	29
Conservative Party (Høyre)	10
Christian Democratic Party (Kristelig Folkeparti)	5
Red Electoral Alliance (Rød Valgallianse)	3
Centre Party (Senterpartiet)	3
Socialist Left Party (Sosialistisk Venstreparti)	2
Liberal Party (Venstre)	1
Total number of members:	53

Notodden kommunestyre 1979–1983
Party name (in Norwegian)	Number of representatives
Labour Party (Arbeiderpartiet)	29
Conservative Party (Høyre)	9
Christian Democratic Party (Kristelig Folkeparti)	6
Red Electoral Alliance (Rød Valgallianse)	1
Centre Party (Senterpartiet)	3
Socialist Left Party (Sosialistisk Venstreparti)	3
Liberal Party (Venstre)	2
Total number of members:	53

Notodden kommunestyre 1975–1979
Party name (in Norwegian)	Number of representatives
Labour Party (Arbeiderpartiet)	30
Conservative Party (Høyre)	5
Christian Democratic Party (Kristelig Folkeparti)	8
New People's Party (Nye Folkepartiet)	1
Centre Party (Senterpartiet)	4
Socialist Left Party (Sosialistisk Venstreparti)	3
Liberal Party (Venstre)	2
Total number of members:	53

Notodden kommunestyre 1971–1975
Party name (in Norwegian)	Number of representatives
Labour Party (Arbeiderpartiet)	30
Conservative Party (Høyre)	5
Christian Democratic Party (Kristelig Folkeparti)	6
Centre Party (Senterpartiet)	4
Socialist People's Party (Sosialistisk Folkeparti)	5
Liberal Party (Venstre)	3
Total number of members:	53

Notodden kommunestyre 1967–1971
Party name (in Norwegian)	Number of representatives
Labour Party (Arbeiderpartiet)	31
Conservative Party (Høyre)	6
Christian Democratic Party (Kristelig Folkeparti)	5
Centre Party (Senterpartiet)	3
Socialist People's Party (Sosialistisk Folkeparti)	4
Liberal Party (Venstre)	4
Total number of members:	53

Notodden kommunestyre 1963–1967
Party name (in Norwegian)	Number of representatives
Labour Party (Arbeiderpartiet)	33
Conservative Party (Høyre)	6
Christian Democratic Party (Kristelig Folkeparti)	4
Centre Party (Senterpartiet)	3
Socialist People's Party (Sosialistisk Folkeparti)	4
Liberal Party (Venstre)	3
Total number of members:	53
Note: On 1 January 1964, Notodden Municipality was merged with Heddal Municipality and Gransherad Municipality.

Notodden bystyre 1959–1963
Party name (in Norwegian)	Number of representatives
Labour Party (Arbeiderpartiet)	22
Conservative Party (Høyre)	6
Communist Party (Kommunistiske Parti)	2
Christian Democratic Party (Kristelig Folkeparti)	5
Liberal Party (Venstre)	2
Total number of members:	37

Notodden bystyre 1955–1959
Party name (in Norwegian)	Number of representatives
Labour Party (Arbeiderpartiet)	21
Conservative Party (Høyre)	6
Communist Party (Kommunistiske Parti)	3
Christian Democratic Party (Kristelig Folkeparti)	5
Liberal Party (Venstre)	2
Total number of members:	37

Notodden bystyre 1951–1955
Party name (in Norwegian)	Number of representatives
Labour Party (Arbeiderpartiet)	21
Conservative Party (Høyre)	6
Communist Party (Kommunistiske Parti)	3
Christian Democratic Party (Kristelig Folkeparti)	4
Liberal Party (Venstre)	2
Total number of members:	36

Notodden bystyre 1947–1951
Party name (in Norwegian)	Number of representatives
Labour Party (Arbeiderpartiet)	19
Conservative Party (Høyre)	5
Communist Party (Kommunistiske Parti)	6
Christian Democratic Party (Kristelig Folkeparti)	4
Liberal Party (Venstre)	2
Total number of members:	36

Notodden bystyre 1945–1947
Party name (in Norwegian)	Number of representatives
Labour Party (Arbeiderpartiet)	17
Conservative Party (Høyre)	4
Communist Party (Kommunistiske Parti)	8
Christian Democratic Party (Kristelig Folkeparti)	5
Liberal Party (Venstre)	2
Total number of members:	36

Notodden bystyre 1937–1940*
Party name (in Norwegian)	Number of representatives
Labour Party (Arbeiderpartiet)	18
Conservative Party (Høyre)	12
Liberal Party (Venstre)	6
Total number of members:	36
Note: Due to the German occupation of Norway during World War II, no elections were held for new municipal councils until after the war ended in 1945.

Notodden bystyre 1934–1937
Party name (in Norwegian)	Number of representatives
Labour Party (Arbeiderpartiet)	19
Nasjonal Samling Party (Nasjonal Samling)	2
Liberal Party (Venstre)	6
Joint List(s) of Non-Socialist Parties (Borgerlige Felleslister)	9
Total number of members:	36

Notodden bystyre 1931–1934
Party name (in Norwegian)	Number of representatives
Labour Party (Arbeiderpartiet)	18
Liberal Party (Venstre)	6
Joint List(s) of Non-Socialist Parties (Borgerlige Felleslister)	12
Total number of members:	36

Notodden bystyre 1928–1931
Party name (in Norwegian)	Number of representatives
Labour Party (Arbeiderpartiet)	19
Radical People's Party (Radikale Folkepartiet)	1
Liberal Party (Venstre)	4
Joint list of the Conservative Party (Høyre) and the Free-minded Liberal Party (Frisinnede Venstre)	6
Notodden homeowners' association (Notodden huseierforening)	1
Notodden taxpayers' association (Notodden skattebetaleresforening)	5
Total number of members:	36

Notodden bystyre 1925–1928
Party name (in Norwegian)	Number of representatives
Labour Party (Arbeiderpartiet)	15
Labour Democrats (Arbeiderdemokratene)	9
Social Democratic Labour Party (Socialdemokratiske Arbeiderparti)	3
Joint list of the Conservative Party (Høyre) and the Free-minded Liberal Party (Frisinnede Venstre)	5
Workers' Common List (Arbeidernes fellesliste)	2
Homeowners' Common List (Huseieres fellesliste)	2
Total number of members:	36

Notodden bystyre 1922–1925
Party name (in Norwegian)	Number of representatives
Labour Party (Arbeiderpartiet)	12
Labour Democrats (Arbeiderdemokratene)	5
Social Democratic Labour Party (Socialdemokratiske Arbeiderparti)	6
Liberal Party (Venstre)	6
Local List(s) (Lokale lister)	7
Total number of members:	36

Notodden bystyre 1919–1922
Party name (in Norwegian)	Number of representatives
Labour Party (Arbeiderpartiet)	18
Labour Democrats (Arbeiderdemokratene)	6
Liberal Party (Venstre)	6
Local List(s) (Lokale lister)	6
Total number of members:	36

=== Mayors ===
The mayor (Norwegian: ordfører) of Notodden Municipality is the political leader of the municipality and the chairperson of the municipal council. The following people have held this position:

- 1913–1913: Johannes Strandli (Ap)
- 1914–1914: Mathias Kleppen (H)
- 1915–1915: Gunnulf Tinne (H)
- 1916–1916: Mathias Kleppen (H)
- 1917–1919: Nerid Asland (H)
- 1920–1922: A.C. Aasnes (H)
- 1923–1924: Olav Andresen (Ap)
- 1925–1925: Frimann Nergaard (H)
- 1926–1927: Hans Helgesen (Ap)
- 1928–1931: Olav Andresen (Ap)
- 1932–1932: Johan Bugge (H)
- 1933–1934: Jens Røkke (H)
- 1935–1940: Olav Andresen (Ap)
- 1941–1945: Arne Bergsvik (NS)
- 1945–1945: Kai Birger Knudsen (Ap)
- 1945–1945: Nerid Asland (H)
- 1946–1946: Kai Birger Knudsen (Ap)
- 1947–1949: Johannes P. Løkke (Ap)
- 1950–1955: Ole Styrvold (Ap)
- 1956–1959: Johannes P. Løkke (Ap)
- 1960–1971: Henry Finrud (Ap)
- 1972–1975: Egil Bergsland (Ap)
- 1976–1983: Hans T. Kasin (Ap)
- 1984–1991: Per Nagelsaker (Ap)
- 1992–1993: Sveinung O. Flaaten (H)
- 1993–1995: Anund Sisjord (KrF)
- 1995–1999: Nils Buverud (Ap)
- 1999–2007: Bjarne Bakken (Ap)
- 2007–2011: Lise Wiik (Ap)
- 2011–2015: Jørn Christensen (H)
- 2015–present: Gry Fuglestveit (Ap)

== Geography ==
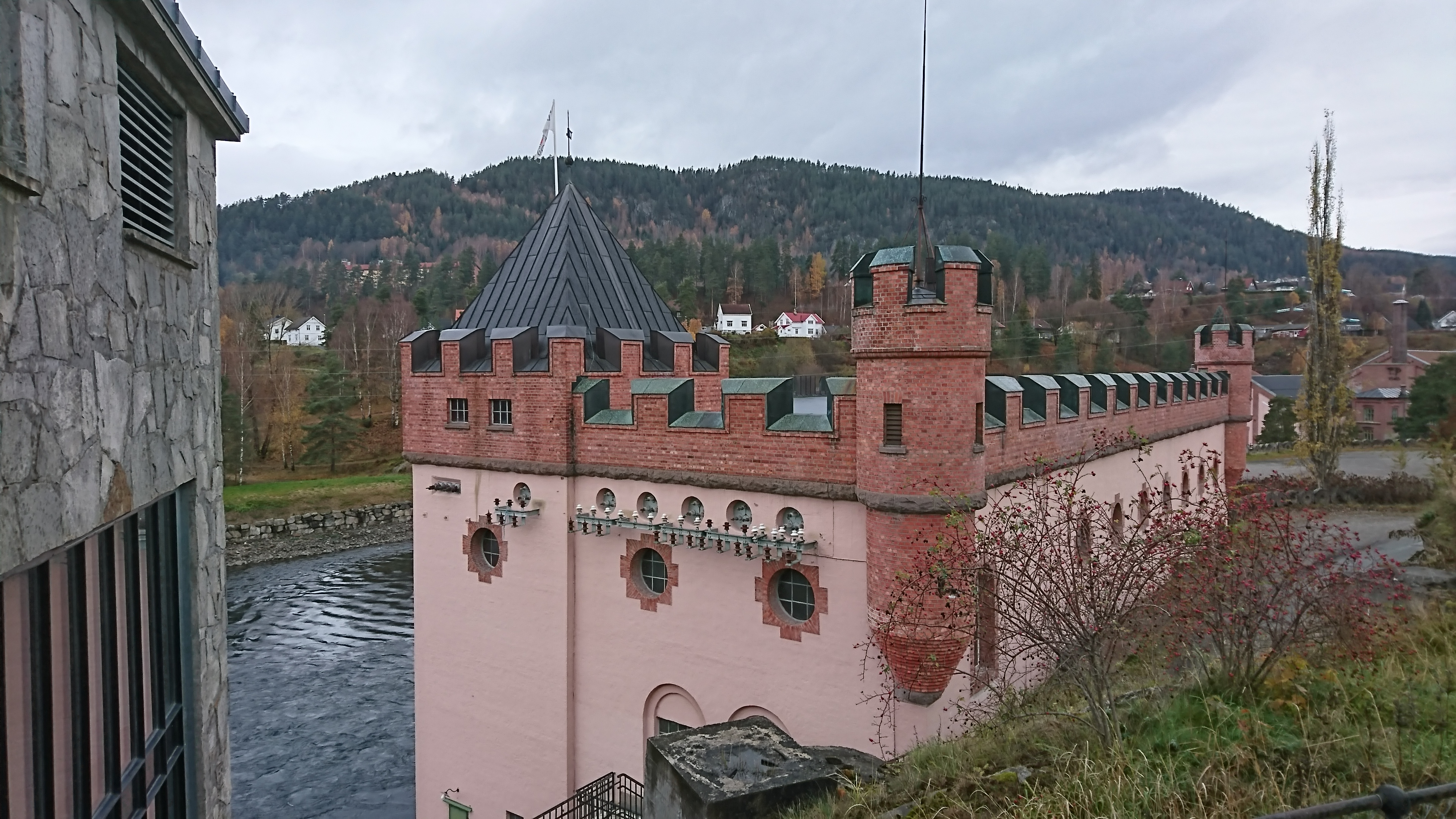
Industrial heritage in Notodden

The municipality is located in Aust-Telemark, along the border with Buskerud county. Notodden Municipality includes the lands between the lakes Tinnsjå and Heddalsvatnet lake. The rivers Tinnelva and Heddøla both run through the municipality. The Blefjell mountains are located in the northern part of the municipality. The highest point in the municipality is the 1,306.04-metre (4,284.9 ft) tall mountain Bledalsrinden, just southeast of the border with Tinn Municipality.

Tinn Municipality is located to the north, Flesberg Municipality is located to the northeast, Kongsberg Municipality is located to the east, Midt-Telemark Municipality is located to the south, Seljord Municipality is located to the southwest, and Hjartdal Municipality is located to the west.

== Climate ==
Notodden has a humid continental climate (Dfb), with cold winters and mild summers. Situated inland at low altitude in the Telemark region, it is one of the warmer towns in Norway during summer. The weather station at Notodden Airport has been recording since March 1970 (temperature and wind speed). Precipitation data is from a different station in Notodden. The all-time high temperature 33.3 °C (91.9 °F) was recorded on 27 July 2018.

Climate data for Notodden Airport 1991–2020 (20 m, avg high/low 2003-2025, precipitation days 1961–90, extremes 2002–2020)
Month	Jan	Feb	Mar	Apr	May	Jun	Jul	Aug	Sep	Oct	Nov	Dec	Year
Record high °C (°F)	11.1 (52.0)	13.8 (56.8)	21.5 (70.7)	24.1 (75.4)	30.3 (86.5)	32.1 (89.8)	33.3 (91.9)	30.3 (86.5)	27.4 (81.3)	20.5 (68.9)	15.7 (60.3)	13.9 (57.0)	33.3 (91.9)
Mean daily maximum °C (°F)	−1.3 (29.7)	1.4 (34.5)	7 (45)	12.8 (55.0)	17.7 (63.9)	21.9 (71.4)	23.5 (74.3)	21.8 (71.2)	17.6 (63.7)	10.5 (50.9)	4 (39)	−0.6 (30.9)	11.4 (52.5)
Daily mean °C (°F)	−4.5 (23.9)	−3.5 (25.7)	0.5 (32.9)	5.6 (42.1)	10.8 (51.4)	14.6 (58.3)	17.1 (62.8)	15.5 (59.9)	11.2 (52.2)	4.9 (40.8)	0.6 (33.1)	−4.2 (24.4)	5.7 (42.3)
Mean daily minimum °C (°F)	−8.6 (16.5)	−7.5 (18.5)	−4 (25)	0 (32)	4.9 (40.8)	9.4 (48.9)	11.7 (53.1)	10.5 (50.9)	7.1 (44.8)	2.1 (35.8)	−2.1 (28.2)	−7 (19)	1.4 (34.5)
Record low °C (°F)	−29.7 (−21.5)	−26.4 (−15.5)	−23.5 (−10.3)	−10.8 (12.6)	−4 (25)	1 (34)	3.6 (38.5)	1.8 (35.2)	−2.9 (26.8)	−10.8 (12.6)	−17.4 (0.7)	−29.1 (−20.4)	−29.7 (−21.5)
Average precipitation mm (inches)	57 (2.2)	32 (1.3)	33 (1.3)	36 (1.4)	55 (2.2)	69 (2.7)	77 (3.0)	86 (3.4)	80 (3.1)	85 (3.3)	78 (3.1)	53 (2.1)	741 (29.1)
Average precipitation days (≥ 1.0 mm)	9	6	7	7	8	9	10	10	10	10	10	8	104
Source 1: yr.no/Norwegian Meteorological Institute
Source 2: Seklima (avg highs/lows)

== Twin towns ==
In 2008, the Notodden council decided to end the twin city agreements with Ilisalmi, Nyköping, and Stelle. At the same time Suwałki was approved as a new twin city.

Notodden has sister city agreements with the following places:

- Clarksdale, Mississippi, United States
- Suwałki, Podlaskie Voivodeship, Poland

Notodden used to have sister city agreements with the following places:

- Iisalmi, Eastern Finland, Finland
- Nyköping, Södermanland County, Sweden
- Stelle, Lower Saxony, Germany

== Notable people ==
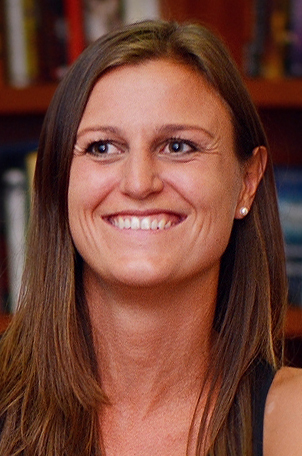
Helga Flatland, 2016

- Kåre Nordstoga, an organist
- Hans Herbjørnsrud, an internationally known author who was born in Heddal
- Olav Gunnarsson Helland (1875–1939), a Hardanger fiddlemaker who many consider the finest of the twentieth century
- Klaus Egge (born 1906 in Gransherad), a composer
- Ådne Søndrål, an Olympic gold medalist
- Seasick Steve, an American blues musician who is achieving fame in the United Kingdom, currently resides in Notodden
- Margit Bakken, a blues musician and songwriter
- Tor-Arne Moen, a painter and author
- Olav Andresen (1877 in Heddal–1950), a politician who was Mayor of Notodden in the 1920s and 1930s
- Ambros Sollid (1880 in Heddal–1973), an agronomist and politician who was Mayor of Skien from 1935–1937
- Carl Bugge (1881 in Heddal–1968), a geologist and academic
- Helga Stene (1904 in Notodden–1983), an educator, feminist, and resistance member
- Aage Eriksen (1917 in Notodden–1998 in Notodden), a wrestler and silver medallist at the 1948 Summer Olympics
- Egil Bergsland (1924 in Notodden–2007), a politician who was Mayor of Notodden from 1971 to 1975
- Sissel Sellæg (1928 in Notodden–2014), an actress
- Hilde Mæhlum (born 1945 in Notodden), a sculptor
- Magne Orre (born 1950 in Notodden), a cyclist, competed at the 1972 & 1976 Summer Olympics
- Helga Flatland (born 1984 in Notodden), a novelist and children's writer

One of the most influential Norwegian black metal bands, Emperor, came from Notodden, as does Mortiis, Peccatum, Star of Ash, Leprous, and Zyklon. Emperor's singer, Ihsahn, still resides in Notodden.
