= Agder Court of Appeal =

Court of appeal in Skien, Norway

- Agder lagmannsrett
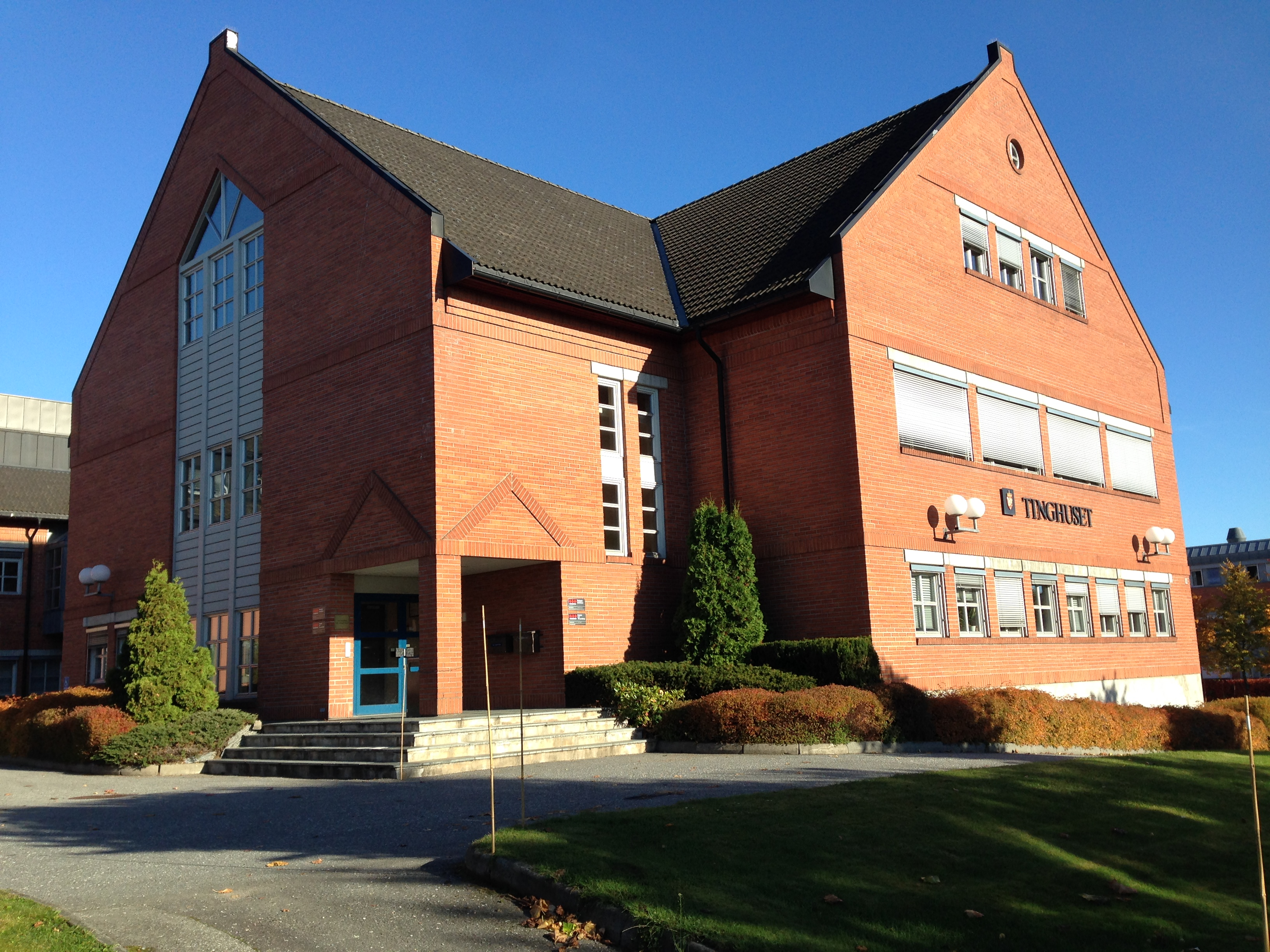
- Agder Court of Appeal building in Skien
- Interactive map of Agder Court of Appeal
- 59°13′08″N 9°35′54″E
- Established: 1 July 1936
- Jurisdiction: Vestfold, Telemark, and Agder
- Location: Gjerpensgate 16; Skien, Norway
- Coordinates: 59°13′08″N 9°35′54″E
- Composition method: Court of Appeal
- Appeals to: Supreme Court of Norway
- Appeals from: District courts
- Number of positions: 39
- Website: Official website

Chief Judge (Førstelagmann)
- Currently: Dag Bugge Nordén

The Agder Court of Appeal (Norwegian: Agder lagmannsrett) is one of six courts of appeal in the Kingdom of Norway. The Court is located in the town of Skien. The court has jurisdiction over the counties of Vestfold, Telemark, and Agder (except for Sirdal Municipality which falls under the Gulating Court of Appeal). These areas constitute the Agder judicial district (Norwegian: Agder lagdømme). This court can rule on both civil and criminal cases that are appealed from one of its subordinate district courts. Court decisions can be, to a limited extent, appealed to the Supreme Court of Norway. The court has 21 judges and 13 administrative staff, including a director. The chief judicial officer of the court (Norwegian: førstelagmann) is currently Dag Bugge Norden. The court is administered by the Norwegian National Courts Administration.

== Location ==
The Court has its seat in the town of Skien. Additionally, the Court permanently sits in the towns of Tønsberg, Kristiansand, and Arendal. The Court may also sit in other places within its jurisdiction as needed.

== Jurisdiction ==
This court accepts appeals from all of the district courts from its geographic jurisdiction. This court is divided into judicial regions (Norwegian: lagsogn) and there is one or more district courts (Norwegian: tingrett) that belongs to each of these regions.

Judicial Regions (lagsogner)	District courts (tingretter)
Agder	Agder District Court
Telemark	Nedre Telemark District Court; Øvre Telemark District Court
Vestfold	Vestfold District Court

== History ==
This court was created in on 1 July 1936 when the old Borgarting og Agder Court of Appeal was split into two: Borgarting Court of Appeal in the north and the present Agder Court of Appeal in the south.
