= Hjartdal =

Hjartdal may refer to:

== Places ==
- Hjartdal Municipality, a municipality in Telemark county, Norway
- Hjartdal (village), a village within Hjartdal Muncipality in Telemark county, Norway
- Hjartdal Church, a church in Hjartdal Muncipality in Telemark county, Norway
- Hjartdal prestegjeld, a former geographic subdivision of the Church of Norway in Telemark county, Norway
