= Hjartdøla =

River in Telemark, Norway

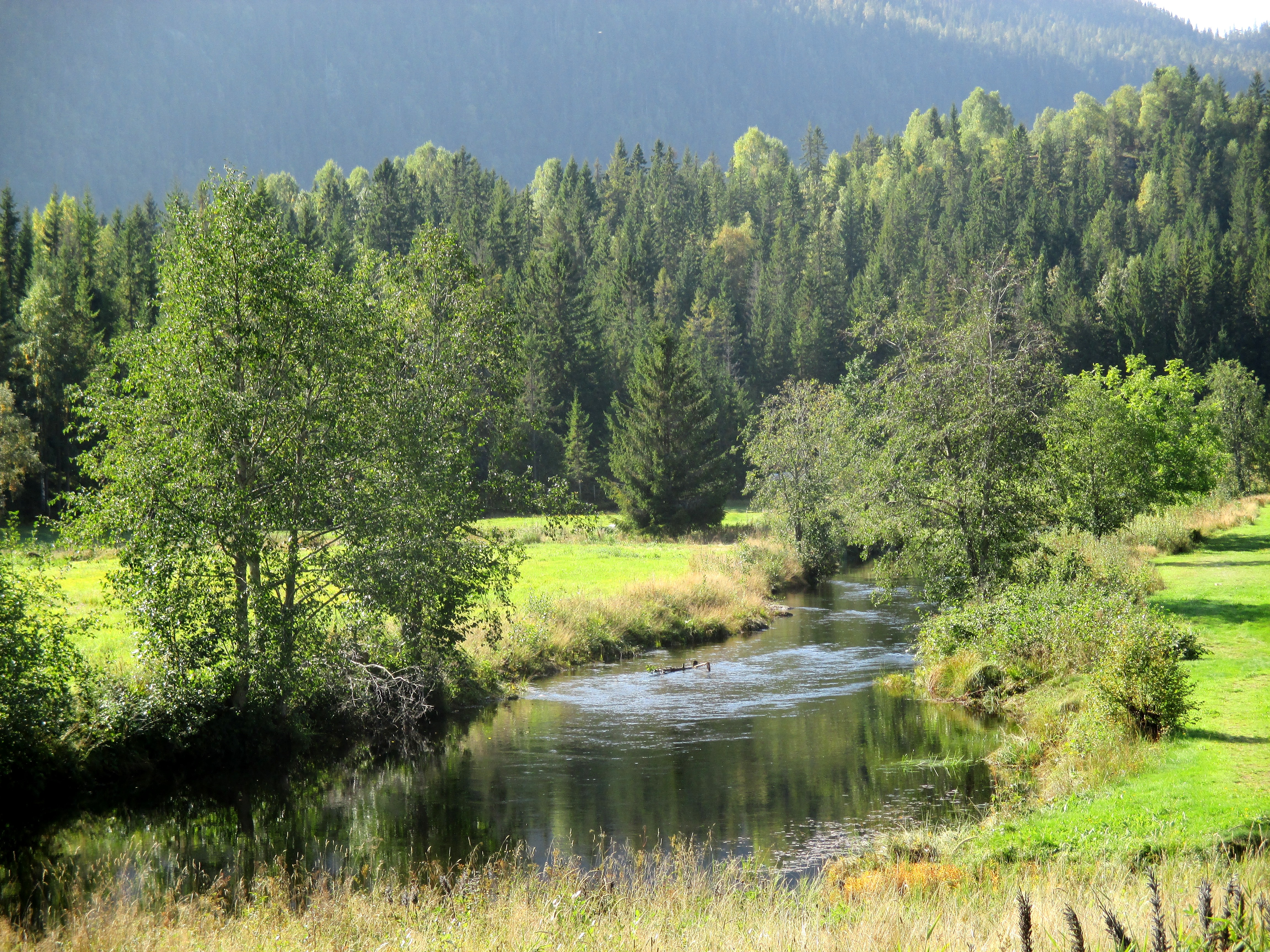
- View of the river near Hjartdal Church

Location
- Country: Norway
- County: Telemark
- Municipalities: Hjartdal Municipality

Physical characteristics
- Source
  - location: Stusshøl, Hjartdal Municipality
  - coordinates: 59°38′15″N 8°35′18″E
  - elevation: 620 metres (2,030 ft)
- Mouth: Heddøla river
  - location: Sauland, Hjartdal Municipality
  - coordinates: 59°36′49″N 8°57′20″E
  - elevation: 78 metres (256 ft)
- Length: 26 km (16 mi)
- Basin size: 825 km^{2} (319 sq mi)

Hjartdøla is a river in Hjartdal Municipality in Telemark county, Norway. The 26-kilometre (16 mi) long river is part of the Skien watershed. The river is formed at the confluence of the river Bjordøla and some smaller rivers coming from the lakes Skjesvatnet and Breidvatnet, about 5 kilometres (3.1 mi) north of the village of Hjartdal. From here, it runs through the village of Hjartdal, then through the lake Hjartsjåvatnet, and through the village of Sauland. At Sauland, the river meets the river Skogsåa and after this confluence, the two rivers form the river Heddøla which then continues on to Heddal and the lake Heddalsvatnet.

== See also ==
- List of rivers in Norway
