= Nils Sletta =

Norwegian actor (1943–2020)

- Born: 23 April 1943; Tuddal, Norway
- Died: 26 November 2020 (aged 77)
- Occupation: Actor
- Partner: Grethe Ryen
- Children: Torbjørn Sletta Jacobsen
- Awards: Norwegian Theatre Critics Award (1997); Gullruten (2008)

Nils Sletta (23 April 1943 – 26 November 2020) was a Norwegian actor.

== Career ==
Born in Tuddal in 1943, Sletta made his stage debut at Nationaltheatret in 1964. His next assignments were with Riksteatret from 1965 to 1967, and with Trøndelag Teater from 1967 to 1969. From 1969 he was appointed at Det Norske Teatret. He made his film debut in 1967, in Skouen's Musikanter, and appeared in around thirty films or television series.

In 1997 he received the Theatre Critics Award from the Norwegian Critics' Association, for his role "Mattis" in a theatre adaptation of Vesaas' novel Fuglane. He received Aksel Waldemar's Memorial Prize twice, in 2001 and 2007, for his contribution to the application of Nynorsk language on stage. Playing the character "Tor" in the TV series Berlinerpoplene (based on novels by Anne B. Ragde), earned him the Gullruten award in 2008.

== Personal life ==
Sletta lived together with actress Grethe Ryen, and was the father of jazz musician Torbjørn Sletta Jacobsen.

He died on 26 November 2020.
