= Hjartdal Municipality =

Municipality in Telemark, Norway

Hjartdal Municipality Hjartdal kommune
- Municipality
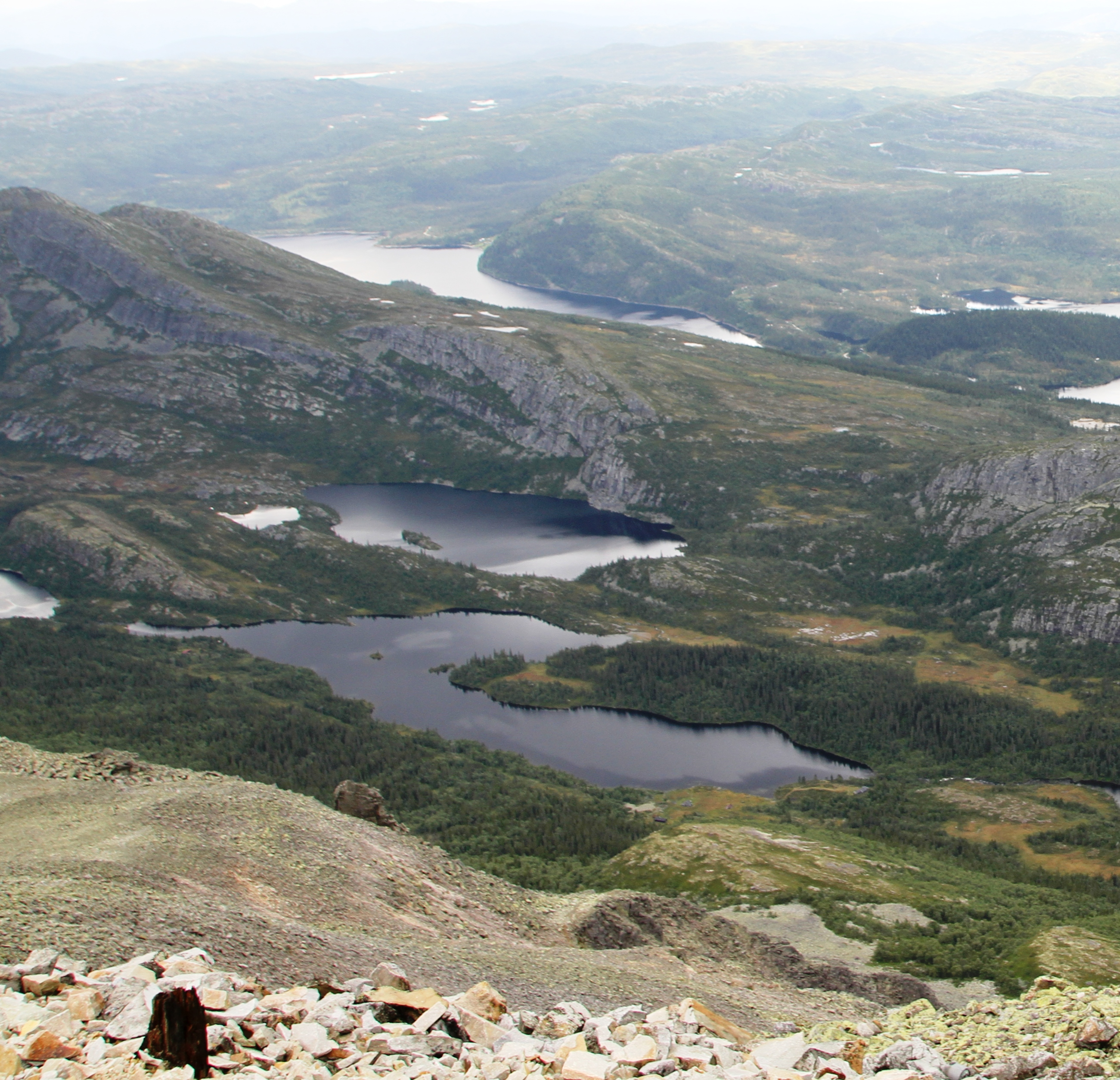
- View of the Hjartdal wilderness

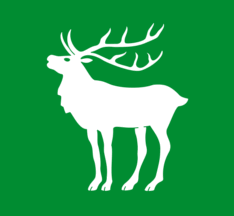
- Flag Coat of arms

- Telemark within Norway

- Hjartdal within Telemark
- Coordinates: 59°39′54″N 8°43′34″E
- Country: Norway
- County: Telemark
- District: Aust-Telemark
- Established: 1 Jan 1838
  - Created as: Formannskapsdistrikt
- Administrative centre: Sauland

Government
  - Mayor (2015): Bengt Halvard Odden (Ap)

Area
  - Total: 791.61 km^{2} (305.64 sq mi)
  - Land: 737.13 km^{2} (284.61 sq mi)
  - Water: 54.48 km^{2} (21.03 sq mi) 6.9%
  - Rank: #145 in Norway
- Highest elevation: 1,612.8 m (5,291 ft)

Population (2026)
  - Total: 1,638
  - Rank: #300 in Norway
  - Density: 2.2/km^{2} (5.7/sq mi)
  - Change (10 years): ▲ +1.5%
- Demonym: Hjartdøl

Official language
  - Norwegian form: Nynorsk
- Time zone: UTC+01:00 (CET)
  - Summer (DST): UTC+02:00 (CEST)
- ISO 3166 code: NO-4024
- Website: Official website

Hjartdal (Norwegian pronunciation: [²jɑʈːdɑːl]; locally [²jɑʈːdɑːɽ]) is a municipality in Telemark county, Norway. It is located in the traditional district of Upper Telemark and Aust-Telemark. The administrative centre of the municipality is the village of Sauland. Other villages in the municipality include Tuddal and Hjartdalsbygda.

The 791.61-square-kilometre (305.64 sq mi) municipality is the 145th largest by area out of the 357 municipalities in Norway. Hjartdal Municipality is the 300th most populous municipality in Norway with a population of 1,638. The municipality's population density is 2.2 inhabitants per square kilometre (5.7/sq mi) and its population has increased by 1.5% over the previous 10-year period.

== General information ==
=== Administrative history ===
The formannskapsdistrikt law of 1837 created a system of local government in Norway by establishing each town (ladested or kjøpstad) and each Church of Norway prestegjeld as a civil municipality. On 1 January 1838, Hierdal prestegjeld was established as Hierdal Municipality (later spelled Hjartdal).

In 1860, Hjartdal Municipality was divided as follows: the eastern district (population: 1,310) became part of the new Gransherred Municipality (along with the Hovin area from Tinn Municipality) and the western district continued as a smaller Hjartdal Municipality. At the same time, the administrative centre of the municipality was moved from Hjartdalsbygda to Sauland. On 23 January 1905, a small, unpopulated area of Hjartdal Municipality was transferred to the neighboring Seljord Municipality.

In 2020, there were many municipal and county mergers across Norway due to the work of the Solberg cabinet. Historically, this municipality was part of Telemark county. On 1 January 2020, the municipality became a part of the newly-formed Vestfold og Telemark county (after Telemark and Vestfold counties were merged). The merger was shortlived, and on 1 January 2024, the merger was undone and this municipality became part of Telemark county once again.

=== Name ===
The municipality is named after the old Hjartdal prestegjeld. The prestegjeld was named after the local valley name, Hjartdalen (Old Norse: Hjartdalr) since the first Hjartdal Church was built there. The first element is the old name for the local river Hjartdøla. The old river name is likely derived from the word hjǫrtr which means "red deer". The last element is dalr which means "valley" or "dale". Prior to the 20th century, the name was often spelled Hierdal, a corruption of the original name. In the 20th century, the spelling was standardized to Hjartdal, bringing back more of the original spelling.

=== Coat of arms ===
The coat of arms was granted on 17 February 1989. The official blazon is "Vert, a deer at bay argent" (Norwegian: På grøn grunn ein ståande sølv hjort). This means the arms have a green field (background) and the charge is a red deer (Cervus elaphus) standing at bay. The deer has a tincture of argent which means it is commonly colored white, but if it is made out of metal, then silver is used. They are canting arms because the name of the municipality is derived from the word for deer, a common animal in the rural municipality. The color green was chosen to represent the forests in the area. The arms were designed by Svein G. Carlsen. The municipal flag has the same design as the coat of arms.

=== Churches ===
The Church of Norway has one parish (sokn) within Hjartdal Municipality. It is part of the Øvre Telemark prosti (deanery) in the Diocese of Agder og Telemark.

Churches in Hjartdal Municipality
| Parish (sokn) | Church name | Location of the church | Year built |
|---|---|---|---|
| Hjartdal | Hjartdal Church | Hjartdalsbygda | 1809 |
| Hjartdal | Sauland Church | Sauland | 1863 |
| Hjartdal | Tuddal Church | Tuddal | 1796 |

== History ==
Up to the 1500s, the Hjartdal prestegjeld had been quite large. It stretched from Rauland in the west and Kongsberg to the east. Counting from west to east, the villages of Åmotsdal, Svartdal, Hjartdal, Tuddal, Sauland, Gransherad, Bolkesjø, Jondalen, and Lisleherad were all at one point included in the same prestegjeld. Sometime after 1687 Lisleherad was transferred to the Heddal prestegjeld. Then in 1860, the Gransherad area was separated. Today, the Hjartdal parish and municipality consists of the three main village areas: Hjartdalsbygda, Sauland, and Tuddal.

== Geography ==
The rural municipality is located in the mountains of Telemark. The highest point in the municipality is the 1,612.8-metre (5,291 ft) tall mountain Gaustatoppen (the actual peak of Gaustatoppen lies just to the north inside Tinn Municipality. The main river of the municipality is the Hjartdøla which empties into the Heddøla river at Sauland. Tinn Municipality is located to the north, Notodden Municipality is located to the east and south, and Seljord Municipality is located to the west.

== Government ==
Hjartdal Municipality is responsible for primary education (through 10th grade), outpatient health services, senior citizen services, welfare and other social services, zoning, economic development, and municipal roads and utilities. The municipality is governed by a municipal council of directly elected representatives. The mayor is indirectly elected by a vote of the municipal council. The municipality is under the jurisdiction of the Øvre Telemark District Court and the Agder Court of Appeal.

=== Municipal council ===
The municipal council (Kommunestyre) of Hjartdal Municipality is made up of 17 representatives that are elected to four-year terms. The tables below show the current and historical composition of the council by political party.

Hjartdal kommunestyre 2023–2027
| Party name (in Nynorsk) | Number of representatives |
|---|---|
| Labour Party (Arbeidarpartiet) | 10 |
| Christian Democratic Party (Kristeleg Folkeparti) | 2 |
| Centre Party (Senterpartiet) | 5 |
| Total number of members: | 17 |

Hjartdal kommunestyre 2019–2023
| Party name (in Nynorsk) | Number of representatives |
|---|---|
| Labour Party (Arbeidarpartiet) | 8 |
| Christian Democratic Party (Kristeleg Folkeparti) | 2 |
| Centre Party (Senterpartiet) | 7 |
| Total number of members: | 17 |

Hjartdal kommunestyre 2015–2019
| Party name (in Nynorsk) | Number of representatives |
|---|---|
| Labour Party (Arbeidarpartiet) | 7 |
| Conservative Party (Høgre) | 2 |
| Christian Democratic Party (Kristeleg Folkeparti) | 2 |
| Centre Party (Senterpartiet) | 6 |
| Total number of members: | 17 |

Hjartdal kommunestyre 2011–2015
| Party name (in Nynorsk) | Number of representatives |
|---|---|
| Labour Party (Arbeidarpartiet) | 11 |
| Christian Democratic Party (Kristeleg Folkeparti) | 2 |
| Centre Party (Senterpartiet) | 4 |
| Total number of members: | 17 |

Hjartdal kommunestyre 2007–2011
| Party name (in Nynorsk) | Number of representatives |
|---|---|
| Labour Party (Arbeidarpartiet) | 7 |
| Christian Democratic Party (Kristeleg Folkeparti) | 4 |
| Centre Party (Senterpartiet) | 6 |
| Total number of members: | 17 |

Hjartdal kommunestyre 2003–2007
| Party name (in Nynorsk) | Number of representatives |
|---|---|
| Labour Party (Arbeidarpartiet) | 6 |
| Christian Democratic Party (Kristeleg Folkeparti) | 5 |
| Centre Party (Senterpartiet) | 6 |
| Total number of members: | 17 |

Hjartdal kommunestyre 1999–2003
| Party name (in Nynorsk) | Number of representatives |
|---|---|
| Labour Party (Arbeidarpartiet) | 5 |
| Christian Democratic Party (Kristeleg Folkeparti) | 5 |
| Centre Party (Senterpartiet) | 7 |
| Total number of members: | 17 |

Hjartdal kommunestyre 1995–1999
| Party name (in Nynorsk) | Number of representatives |
|---|---|
| Labour Party (Arbeidarpartiet) | 7 |
| Conservative Party (Høgre) | 1 |
| Christian Democratic Party (Kristeleg Folkeparti) | 2 |
| Centre Party (Senterpartiet) | 11 |
| Total number of members: | 21 |

Hjartdal kommunestyre 1991–1995
| Party name (in Nynorsk) | Number of representatives |
|---|---|
| Labour Party (Arbeidarpartiet) | 8 |
| Conservative Party (Høgre) | 2 |
| Christian Democratic Party (Kristeleg Folkeparti) | 3 |
| Centre Party (Senterpartiet) | 8 |
| Total number of members: | 21 |

Hjartdal kommunestyre 1987–1991
| Party name (in Nynorsk) | Number of representatives |
|---|---|
| Labour Party (Arbeidarpartiet) | 12 |
| Conservative Party (Høgre) | 3 |
| Christian Democratic Party (Kristeleg Folkeparti) | 5 |
| Centre Party (Senterpartiet) | 5 |
| Total number of members: | 25 |

Hjartdal kommunestyre 1983–1987
| Party name (in Nynorsk) | Number of representatives |
|---|---|
| Labour Party (Arbeidarpartiet) | 11 |
| Conservative Party (Høgre) | 3 |
| Christian Democratic Party (Kristeleg Folkeparti) | 5 |
| Centre Party (Senterpartiet) | 6 |
| Total number of members: | 25 |

Hjartdal kommunestyre 1979–1983
| Party name (in Nynorsk) | Number of representatives |
|---|---|
| Labour Party (Arbeidarpartiet) | 10 |
| Conservative Party (Høgre) | 3 |
| Christian Democratic Party (Kristeleg Folkeparti) | 5 |
| Centre Party (Senterpartiet) | 7 |
| Total number of members: | 25 |

Hjartdal kommunestyre 1975–1979
| Party name (in Nynorsk) | Number of representatives |
|---|---|
| Labour Party (Arbeidarpartiet) | 10 |
| Christian Democratic Party (Kristeleg Folkeparti) | 5 |
| Joint list of the Centre Party (Senterpartiet) and the Liberal Party (Venstre) | 10 |
| Total number of members: | 25 |

Hjartdal kommunestyre 1971–1975
| Party name (in Nynorsk) | Number of representatives |
|---|---|
| Labour Party (Arbeidarpartiet) | 10 |
| Joint List(s) of Non-Socialist Parties (Borgarlege Felleslister) | 15 |
| Total number of members: | 25 |

Hjartdal kommunestyre 1967–1971
| Party name (in Nynorsk) | Number of representatives |
|---|---|
| Labour Party (Arbeidarpartiet) | 11 |
| Joint List(s) of Non-Socialist Parties (Borgarlege Felleslister) | 14 |
| Total number of members: | 25 |

Hjartdal kommunestyre 1963–1967
| Party name (in Nynorsk) | Number of representatives |
|---|---|
| Labour Party (Arbeidarpartiet) | 11 |
| Joint List(s) of Non-Socialist Parties (Borgarlege Felleslister) | 14 |
| Total number of members: | 25 |

Hjartdal heradsstyre 1959–1963
| Party name (in Nynorsk) | Number of representatives |
|---|---|
| Labour Party (Arbeidarpartiet) | 11 |
| Joint List(s) of Non-Socialist Parties (Borgarlege Felleslister) | 14 |
| Total number of members: | 25 |

Hjartdal heradsstyre 1955–1959
| Party name (in Nynorsk) | Number of representatives |
|---|---|
| Labour Party (Arbeidarpartiet) | 11 |
| Joint List(s) of Non-Socialist Parties (Borgarlege Felleslister) | 14 |
| Total number of members: | 25 |

Hjartdal heradsstyre 1951–1955
| Party name (in Nynorsk) | Number of representatives |
|---|---|
| Labour Party (Arbeidarpartiet) | 10 |
| Joint List(s) of Non-Socialist Parties (Borgarlege Felleslister) | 14 |
| Total number of members: | 24 |

Hjartdal heradsstyre 1947–1951
| Party name (in Nynorsk) | Number of representatives |
|---|---|
| Labour Party (Arbeidarpartiet) | 2 |
| Christian Democratic Party (Kristeleg Folkeparti) | 2 |
| Farmers' Party (Bondepartiet) | 4 |
| Total number of members: | 8 |

Hjartdal heradsstyre 1945–1947
| Party name (in Nynorsk) | Number of representatives |
|---|---|
| Labour Party (Arbeidarpartiet) | 16 |
| Joint List(s) of Non-Socialist Parties (Borgarlege Felleslister) | 18 |
| Local List(s) (Lokale lister) | 2 |
| Total number of members: | 36 |

Hjartdal heradsstyre 1937–1941*
| Party name (in Nynorsk) | Number of representatives |
|---|---|
| Labour Party (Arbeidarpartiet) | 15 |
| Farmers' Party (Bondepartiet) | 4 |
| Joint List(s) of Non-Socialist Parties (Borgarlege Felleslister) | 13 |
| Local List(s) (Lokale lister) | 4 |
| Total number of members: | 36 |
Note: Due to the German occupation of Norway during World War II, no elections were held for new municipal councils until after the war ended in 1945.

=== Mayors ===
The mayor (Nynorsk: ordførar) of Hjartdal Municipality is the political leader of the municipality and the chairperson of the municipal council. The following people have held this position:

- 1838–1841: Gullick Olsen Bolkesjø
- 1841–1843: Gunleik Torbjørnsen Omnes
- 1843–1847: Mathias Mathiassen Kleppen
- 1848–1850: Ole Kittelsen Bøe
- 1851–1851: Ole Rollesen Brekke
- 1852–1856: Mathias Mathiasen Kleppen
- 1857–1857: Gullick Olsen Bolkesjø
- 1858–1858: Ole Rollesen Brekke
- 1859–1872: Torkel Olsen Mosebø
- 1873–1876: Ole Halversen Nordbø
- 1877–1883: Leif Gregarsen Særsland
- 1884–1887: Torkel Olsen Mosebø
- 1888–1891: Kjetil Olsen Dahlen
- 1892–1897: Ole Torkildsen Mosebø
- 1898–1913: Thorbjørn Waale
- 1913–1919: Torgrim Mathiassen Kleppen (V)
- 1919–1922: Ole Gunleiksen Hafsteen
- 1922–1929: Thorbjørn Waale (V)
- 1929–1941: Knut Halvorsen Hovde
- 1941–1944: Mathis Torbjørnsen (NS)
- 1945–1945: Nils Flugon
- 1946–1947: Johannes H. Strand (Ap)
- 1947–1962: Olav Olsen Asland (Bp)
- 1963–1975: Søren Johnsen Bekkhus (LL)
- 1975–1979: Olav Johnsen Bøen (LL)
- 1979–1986: Thomas Harald Timland (Sp)
- 1986–1989: Knut Olsen Bekkhus (KrF)
- 1989–1991: Olav Tho (Sp)
- 1991–1999: Torunn Hovde Kaasa (Sp)
- 1999–2011: Olav Tho (Sp)
- 2011–2015: Sven Tore Løkslid (Ap)
- 2015–present: Bengt Halvard Odden (Ap)

== Transportation ==
The European route E134 highway runs through the municipality. The Mælefjell Tunnel is a road tunnel that is part of the E134 highway and it runs through the Mælefjell mountain.

== Notable people ==
- Hans Paus (1656–1715), a priest and poet
- Drengman Aaker (1839–1894), an American politician and businessman who served in the Iowa House of Representatives
- Kittel Halvorson (1846–1936), a farmer and U.S. Representative from Minnesota
- Nils Sletta (1943–2020), an actor
- Knut Buen (born 1948), a fiddler, composer, folklorist, and publisher who lives in Tuddal
