= Drengman Aaker =

American politician and businessman

- Born: September 24, 1839 or September 30, 1839; Sauland, Hjartdal, Telemark, Norway
- Died: March 30, 1894 (aged 54); Ridgeway, Iowa, United States
- Military career
- Allegiance: United States
- Branch: Union army
- Service years: 1861–1865
- Unit: 12th Iowa Volunteer Infantry Regiment
- Conflicts: American Civil War

Drengman Olsen Aaker (née Aakre; September 24, 1839 – March 30, 1894) was a Norwegian-born American politician, businessman and soldier.

== Biography ==
Drengman Olsen was born on September 30, 1839 at the Sælebotsmoen tenant farm in Sauland parish, Hjartdal Municipality, Telemark county, Norway, according to local baptismal records. Aaker emigrated with his parents to the United States in 1848 and settled in Waukesha County, Wisconsin. In 1854, Aaker and his family settled in Winneshiek County, Iowa. During the American Civil War, Aaker served in the 12th Iowa Volunteer Infantry Regiment.

Aaker later lived in Ridgeway, Iowa and was in the mercantile business. In the years following his marriage in 1869 to Christina Andersdatter Turvold (1849–1922), Aaker grew to become a successful business figure in Winneshiek County, being the operator of a lumber yard. Later he was member of the mercantile firm of Galby and Aaker, dealing in grain throughout the 1870s. In the latter part of that decade Aaker sold his lumber yard and became the owner of the Ridgeway Creamery, which later burned to the ground in March 1884.

From 1882 to 1886, Aaker served in the Iowa House of Representatives and was a Republican. Aaker died at his home in Ridgeway, Iowa at age 54.
