= Sauland Church =

Church in Telemark, Norway

- Sauland kyrkje
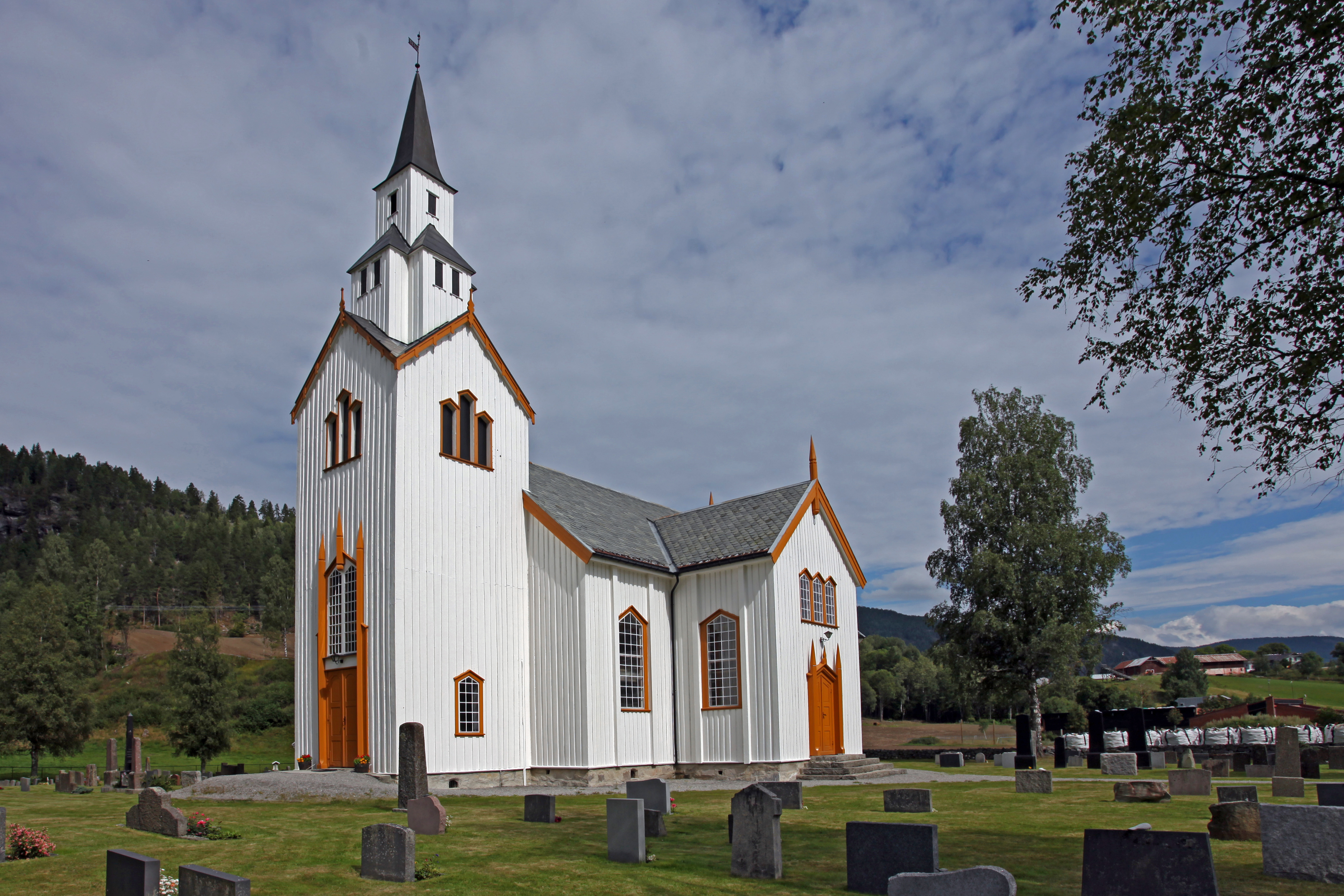
- View of the church
- Sauland Church
- 59°37′14″N 8°55′40″E
- Location: Hjartdal Municipality, Telemark
- Country: Norway
- Denomination: Church of Norway
- Previous denomination: Catholic Church
- Churchmanship: Evangelical Lutheran

History
- Status: Parish church
- Founded: 13th century
- Consecrated: 25 September 1859

Architecture
- Functional status: Active
- Architect: Christian Grosch
- Architectural type: Long church
- Completed: 1859 (167 years ago)

Specifications
- Capacity: 250
- Materials: Wood

Administration
- Diocese: Agder og Telemark
- Deanery: Øvre Telemark prosti
- Parish: Hjartdal
- Norwegian Cultural Heritage Site
- Type: Church
- Status: Listed
- ID: 85405

Sauland Church (Norwegian: Sauland kyrkje) is a parish church of the Church of Norway in Hjartdal Municipality in Telemark county, Norway. It is located in the village of Sauland. It is one of the churches in the Hjartdal parish which is part of the Øvre Telemark prosti (deanery) in the Diocese of Agder og Telemark. The white, wooden church was built in a long church design in 1859 using plans drawn up by the architect Christian Heinrich Grosch. The church seats about 250 people.

== History ==
The earliest existing historical records of the church date back to the year 1395, but the church was not built that year. The first church in Sauland was a wooden stave church that was likely built during the first half of the 13th century. A report from 1595 stated that the church was an annex chapel of the main Hjartdal Church and the priest visited Sauland to hold services every second Sunday (every third Sunday during the winters). By the 1840s, the church was small and in poor condition, but repair plans were drawn up and ready to renovate the old church, but the plans fell through, and it was finally decided to tear down and replace the old building.

Initially, plans were made for a stone church, but this was not accepted by the Ministry of Church Affairs and Education. A new wooden church was designed by Christian Heinrich Grosch which was approved by the ministry with some minor changes in 1854. A builder named Olsen from Kongsberg was commissioned to build the church. In 1856-1857, the old church was torn down and work began on the new building on the same site. The new building has a cruciform design, but the cross arms are very short and are furnished with chairs rather than benches, so it is quite common to refer to the church as a long church. The church has a west tower, and the choir in the east is somewhat narrower with a lower roof line. There is a small sacristy in the extension behind the altarpiece. The new church was consecrated on 23 September 1859, but the church was not completely finished until 1863.

== Media gallery ==
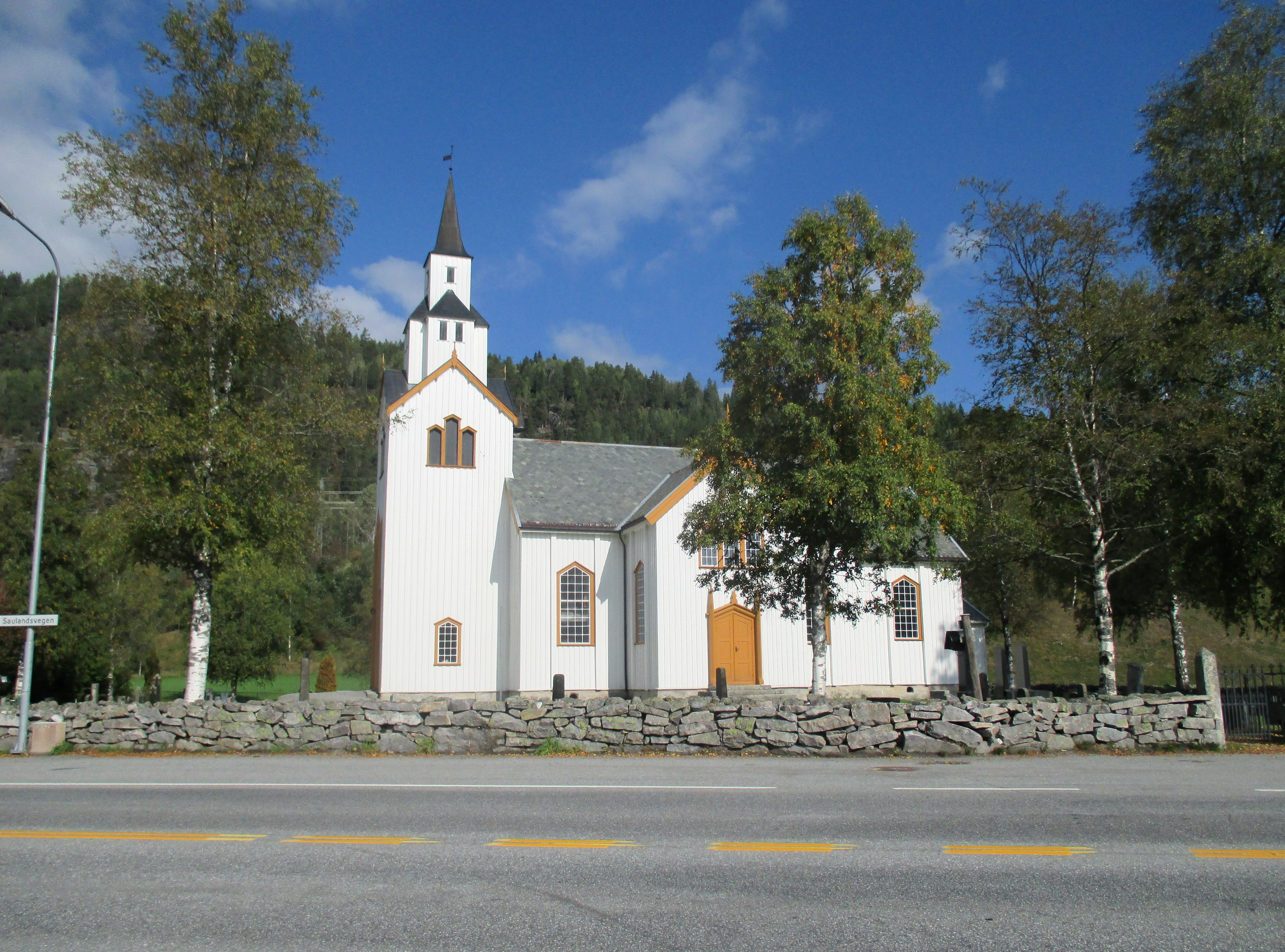

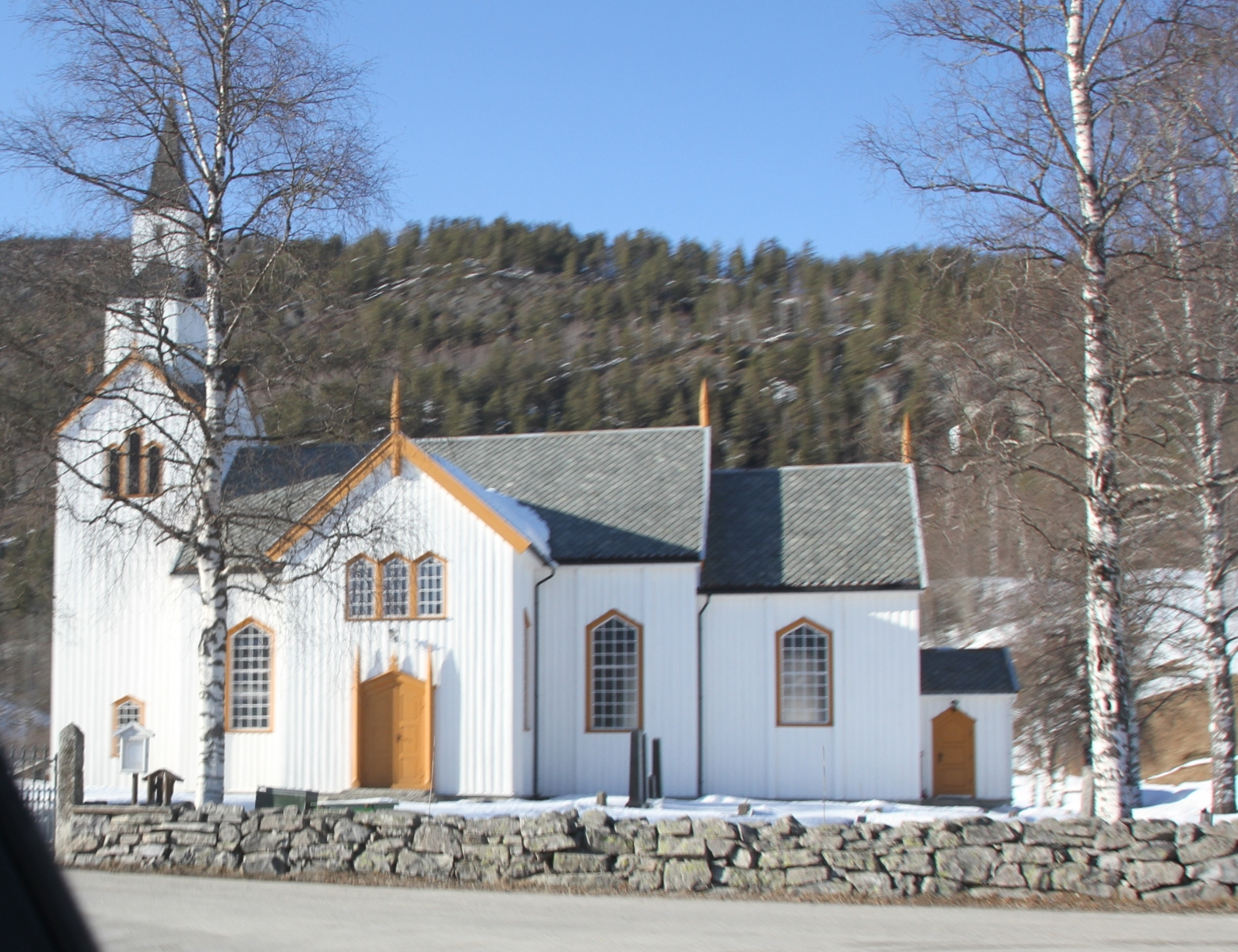

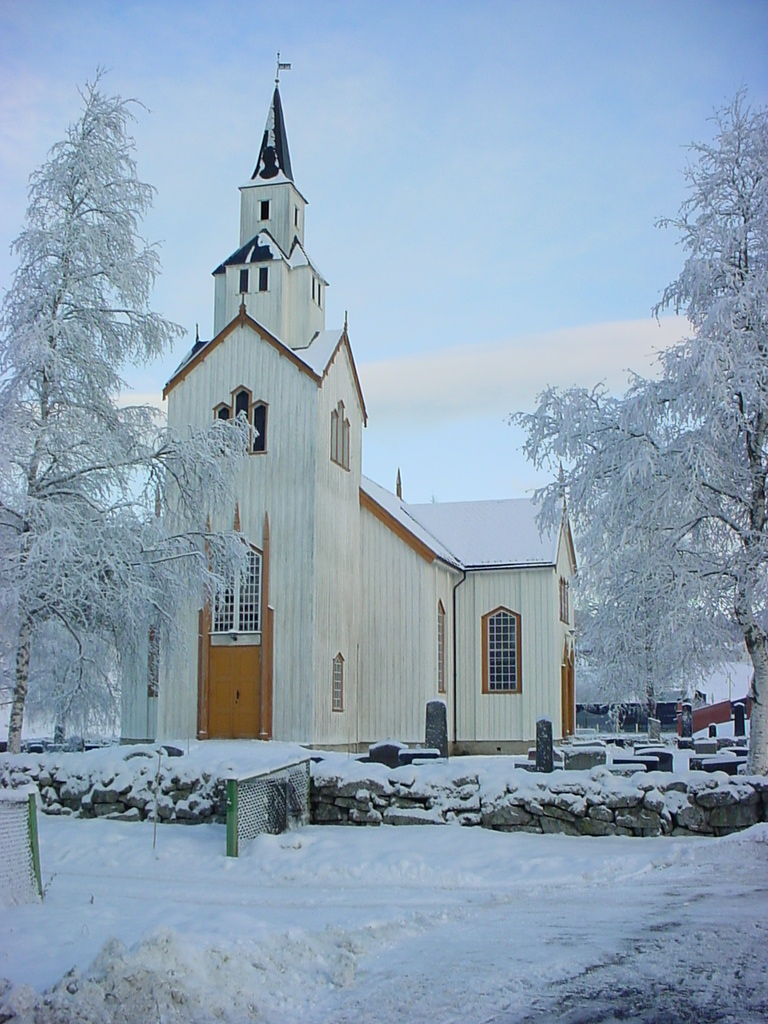

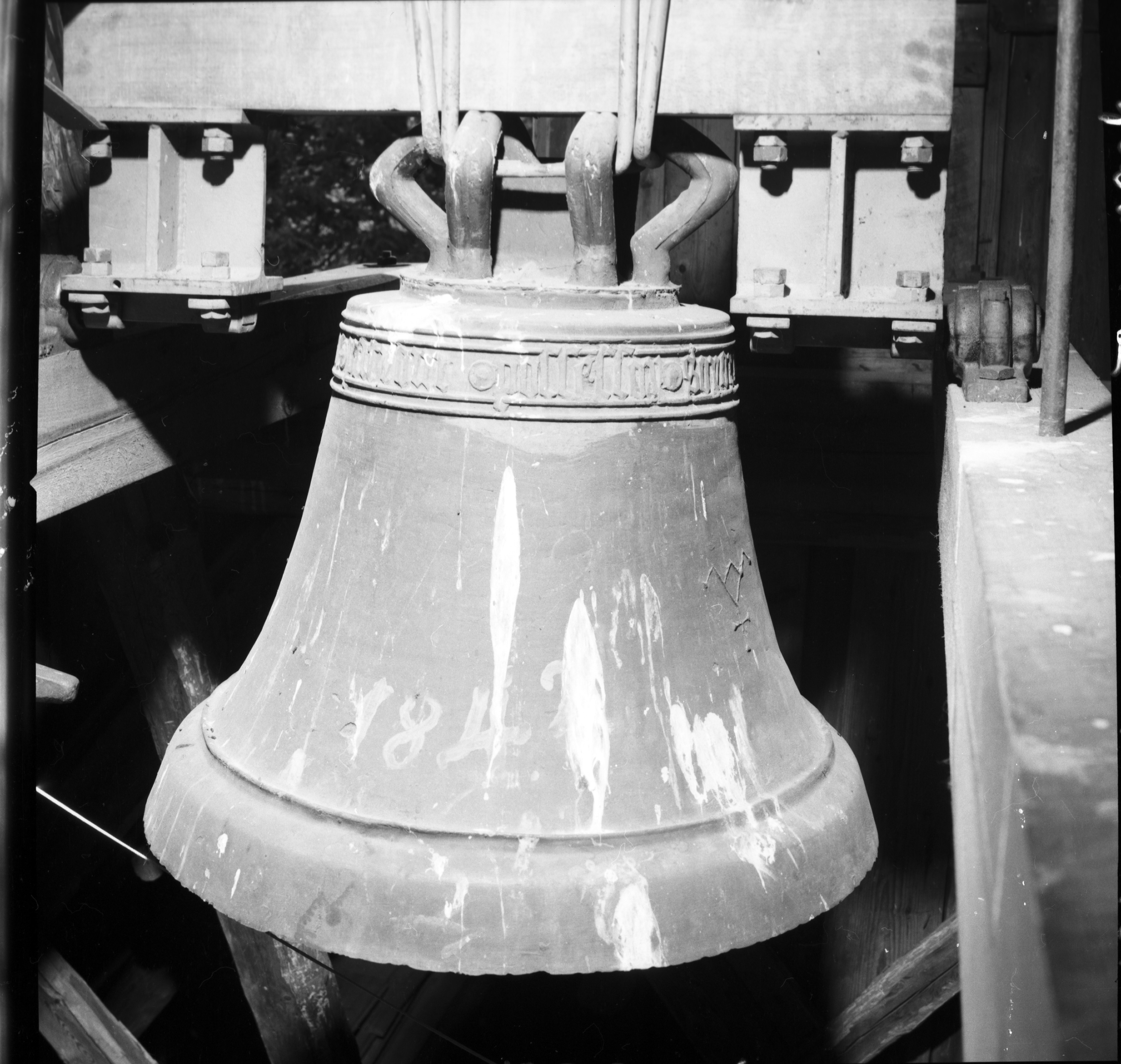

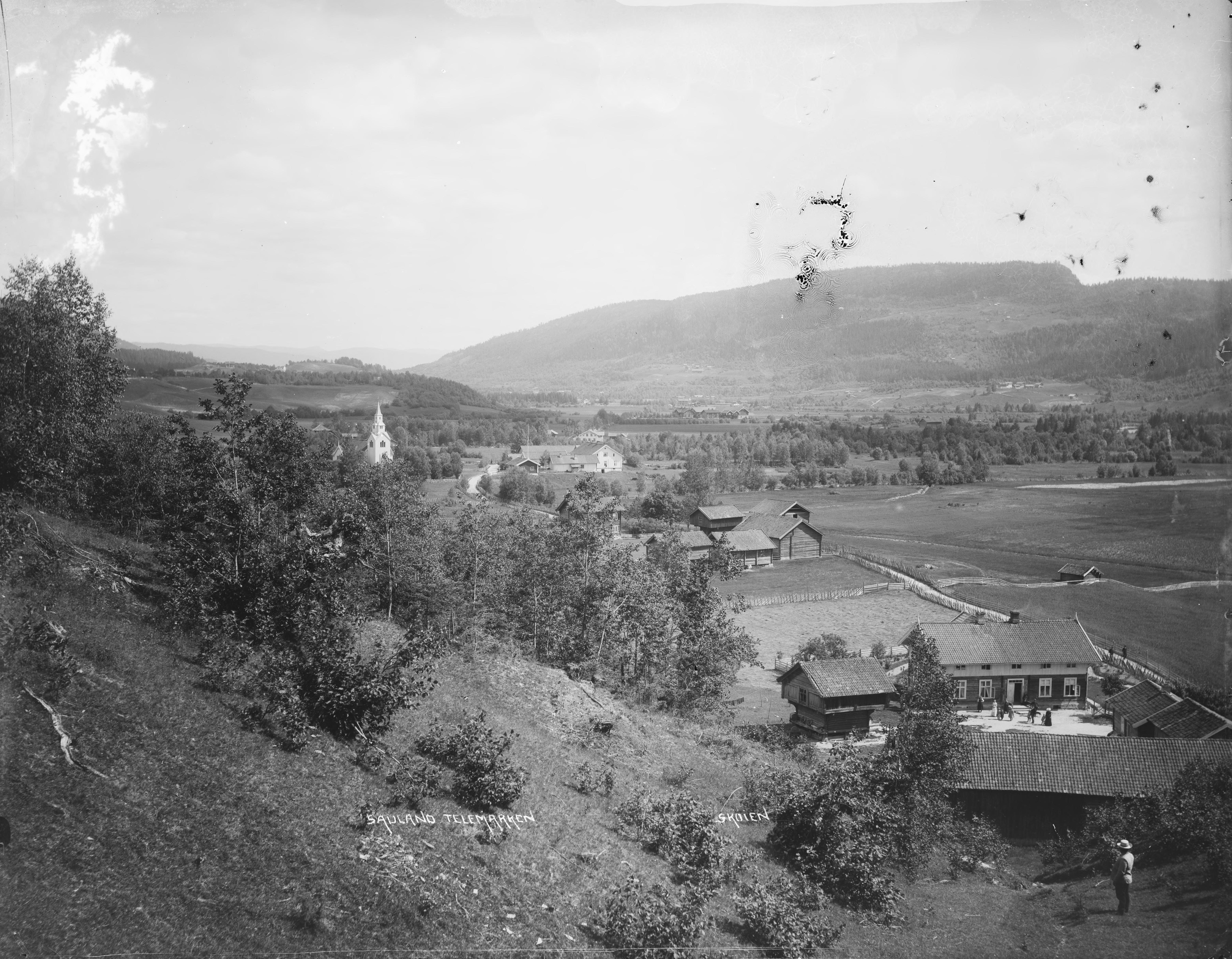

== See also ==
- List of churches in Agder og Telemark
