= Tuddal Church =

Church in Telemark, Norway

- Tuddal kyrkje
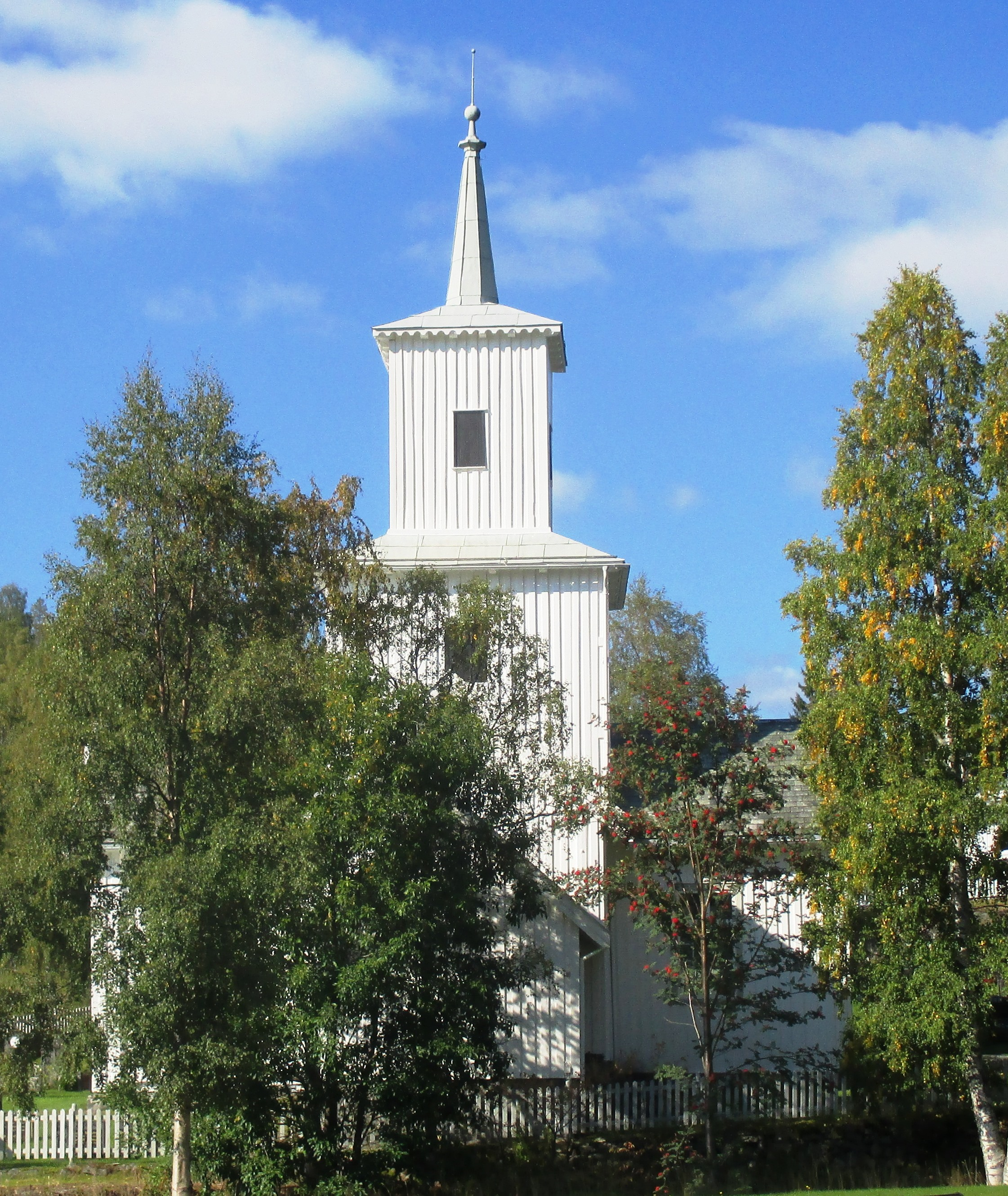
- View of the church
- Tuddal Church
- 59°45′19″N 8°47′18″E
- Location: Hjartdal Municipality, Telemark
- Country: Norway
- Denomination: Church of Norway
- Previous denomination: Catholic Church
- Churchmanship: Evangelical Lutheran

History
- Status: Parish church
- Founded: 13th century

Architecture
- Functional status: Active
- Architect: Halvor Høgkasin
- Architectural type: Cruciform
- Completed: 1796 (230 years ago)

Specifications
- Capacity: 130
- Materials: Wood

Administration
- Diocese: Agder og Telemark
- Deanery: Øvre Telemark prosti
- Parish: Hjartdal
- Norwegian Cultural Heritage Site
- Type: Church
- Status: Automatically protected
- ID: 85680

Tuddal Church (Norwegian: Tuddal kyrkje) is a parish church of the Church of Norway in Hjartdal Municipality in Telemark county, Norway. It is located in the village of Tuddal. It is one of the churches in the Hjartdal parish which is part of the Øvre Telemark prosti (deanery) in the Diocese of Agder og Telemark. The white, wooden church was built in a cruciform design in 1796 using plans drawn up by the architect Halvor Høgkasin. The church seats about 130 people.

== History ==
The first church in Tuddal was a stave church that was likely built during the 13th century. This church burned down in 1369 and there was an investigation to see if it was arson. Records show that a man named Kjetil Karlsson was acquitted of being responsible for the fire by Bishop Magnus in Hamar. Kjetil is said to have lit a candle on the day the church burned, but witnesses could swear that he had extinguished it before he left. Despite the fact that this fire was shortly after the ravages of the Black Death, a new church was built the following year. The new building was also a stave church with an open-air corridor surrounding the nave and chancel. In 1796, the old church was torn down and replaced with a new cruciform church with a central tower that was built by Halvor Høgkasin. The tower was rebuilt in 1876, the year that is found on the wind vane. In 1957, a sacristy was built.

== See also ==
- List of churches in Agder og Telemark
