= Heddøla =

River in Telemark, Norway

Heddøla Heddalselva (unofficial)

Location
- Country: Norway
- County: Telemark
- Municipalities: Notodden, Hjartdal

Physical characteristics
- Source
  - location: Sauland, Hjartdal Municipality
  - coordinates: 59.61366°N 8.955423°E
  - elevation: 78 metres (256 ft)
- Mouth: Heddalsvatnet
  - location: Yli, Notodden Municipality
  - coordinates: 59.554199°N 9.2287731°E
  - elevation: 16 metres (52 ft)
- Length: 20 km (12 mi)

Heddøla is a river in Hjartdal Municipality and Notodden Municipality in Telemark county, Norway. It starts from the junction of the rivers Hjartdøla and Skogsåa in the village of Sauland and it flows through the Heddal valley, past the village of Heddal, and ending at the lake Heddalsvatnet.

== See also ==
- List of rivers in Norway
