= Yli =

Village in Notodden Municipality, Norway

- Village
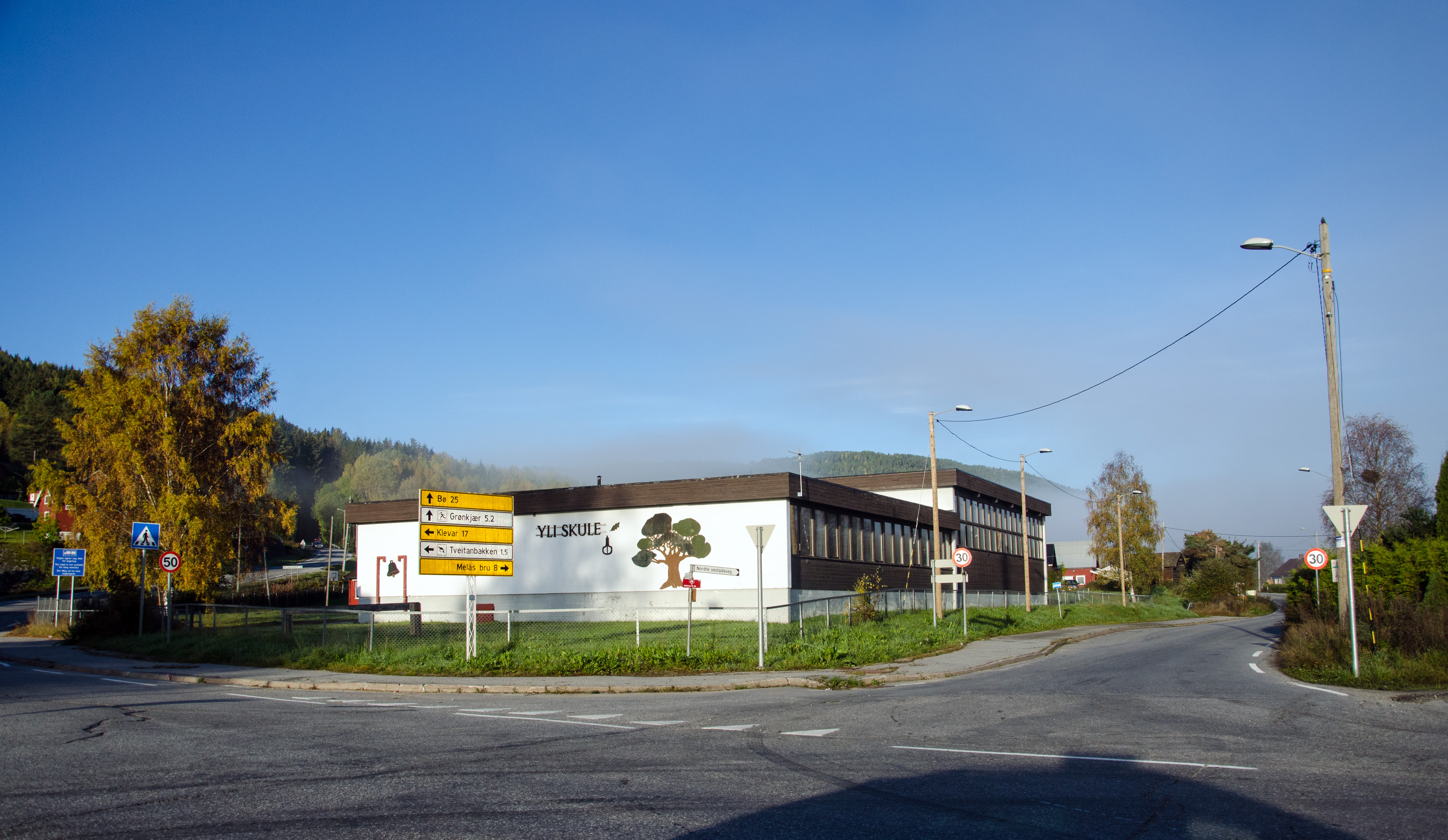
- View of the village school which closed in 2014
- Interactive map of Yli
- Coordinates: 59.5557°N 9.20136°E
- Country: Norway
- Region: Eastern Norway
- County: Telemark
- District: Aust-Telemark
- Municipality: Notodden Municipality

Area
  - Total: 0.24 km^{2} (0.093 sq mi)
- Elevation: 88 m (289 ft)

Population (2025)
  - Total: 290
  - Density: 1,208/km^{2} (3,130/sq mi)
- Time zone: UTC+01:00 (CET)
  - Summer (DST): UTC+02:00 (CEST)
- Post Code: 3677 Notodden

Yli is a village in Notodden Municipality in Telemark county, Norway. The village is located about 5 kilometres (3.1 mi) to the west of the town of Notodden and about 3 kilometres (1.9 mi) to the southeast of the village of Heddal. The river Heddøla flows past the village just before emptying into the lake Heddalsvatnet about 1.5 kilometres (0.93 mi) east of the village.

The 0.24-square-kilometre (59-acre) village has a population (2025) of 290 and a population density of 1,208 inhabitants per square kilometre (3,130/sq mi).

Notodden Airport and the European route E134 highway are both located just north of the village.
