= Heddalsvatnet =

Lake in Telemark, Norway

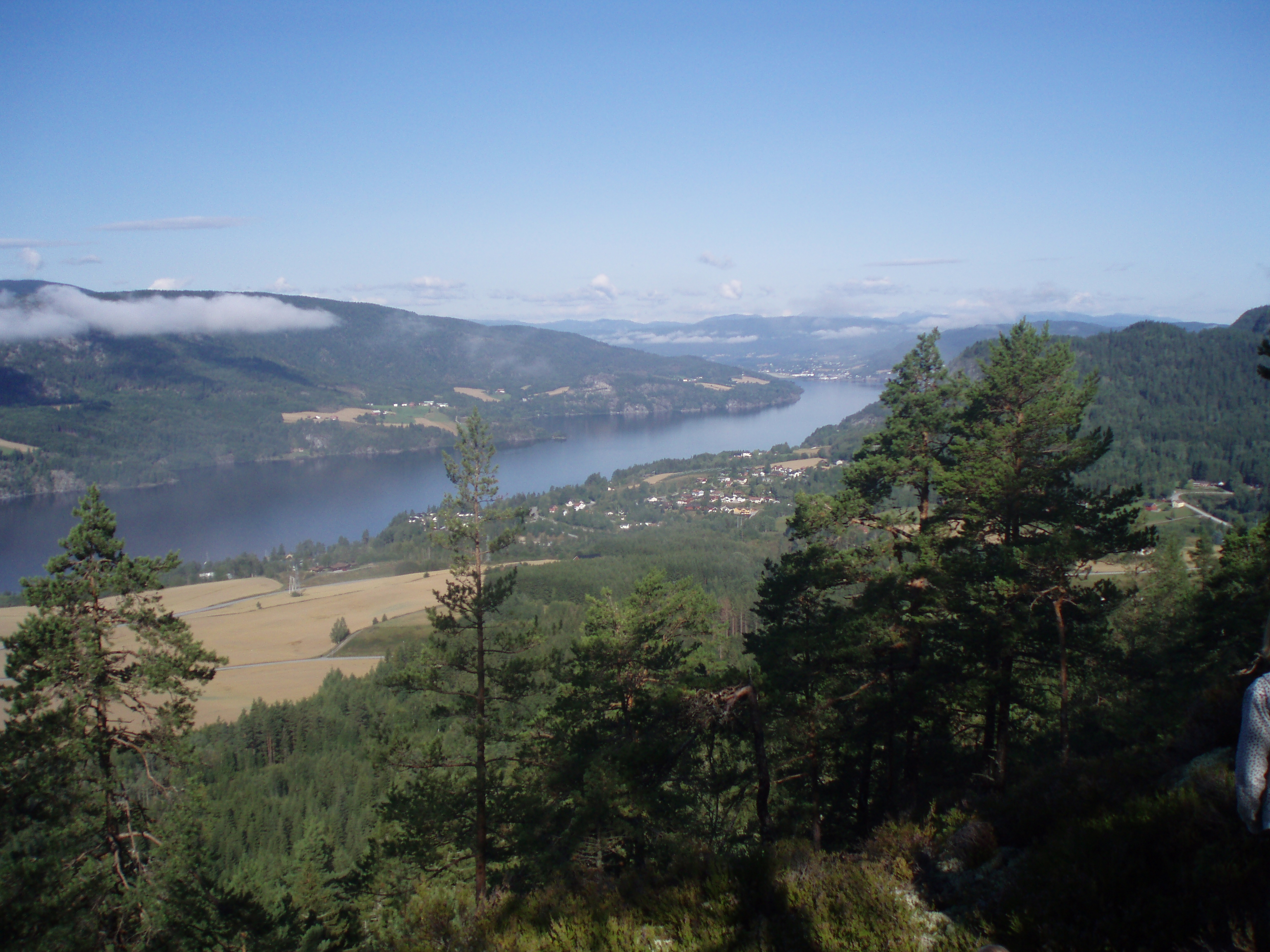
- View of the lake towards Notodden
- Interactive map of Heddalsvatnet
- Location: Notodden and Midt-Telemark, Telemark
- Coordinates: 59.49431°N 9.30623°E
- Type: glacier lake
- Primary inflows: Heddøla, Hjukseelva, Klevaråa, Tinnelva and Tveitåa
- Primary outflows: Saua
- Catchment area: 5,372.82 km^{2} (2,074.46 sq mi)
- Basin countries: Norway
- Max. length: 16 km (9.9 mi)
- Max. width: 1.7 km (1.1 mi)
- Surface area: 13.2 km^{2} (5.1 sq mi)
- Average depth: 37 m (121 ft)
- Max. depth: 54 m (177 ft)
- Water volume: 0.44 km^{3} (0.11 cu mi)
- Surface elevation: 16 m (52 ft)
- Settlements: Notodden
- References: NVE

Heddalsvatnet (lit. 'Lake Heddal') is a lake in Notodden Municipality and Midt-Telemark Municipality in Telemark county, Norway. The 13.2-square-kilometre (5.1 sq mi) lake is located just south of the town of Notodden. The village of Heddal and the Heddalen valley are located to the northwest of the lake.

== Geography ==
The main rivers that flow into the lake are the rivers Tinnelva and Heddøla. The catchment basin covers a total area of 5,372 square kilometres (2,074 sq mi). The southern part of the lake is called Bråfjorden and is separated from the northern part by the Nautsundet strait which is crossed by the county road 360 bridge. The railway line to Notodden (the Bratsberg Line) runs along the eastern shore. The villages of Heddal and Yli lie along the northwestern shore of the lake and the villages of Hjuksebø and Hjuksevelta lie along the eastern shore of the lake.

The lake is part of the Skien watershed and is connected to the ocean by the Telemark Canal. Heddalsvatnet is only 16 metres (52 ft) above sea level and only two locks at Skien were needed to allow ships to sail on the lake. The canal opened in 1861 and made Notodden into Norway's largest fresh water port. In the late 1800s, seafaring vessels were constructed at the shores of Heddalsvatnet.

== History ==
In Neolithic times, after the ice age, the ocean was about 150 metres (490 ft) higher in this area. Heddalsvatnet was a saltwater fjord connected to the ocean. The ocean stretched inland like a fjord past Heddalsvatnet, all the way to Hjartdal. The first humans in central Telemark presumably travelled by boat deep inland along the fjords that are now gone.

Post-glacial rebound eventually separated Heddalsvatnet from the ocean and turned it into a freshwater lake. As the ocean levels decreased, the lake became separated from the ocean around 1500 BC. The water in the lake gradually became freshwater around the Bronze Age, according to archaeologist Pål Nymoen.
