= Lisleherad Church =

Church in Telemark, Norway

- Lisleherad kirke
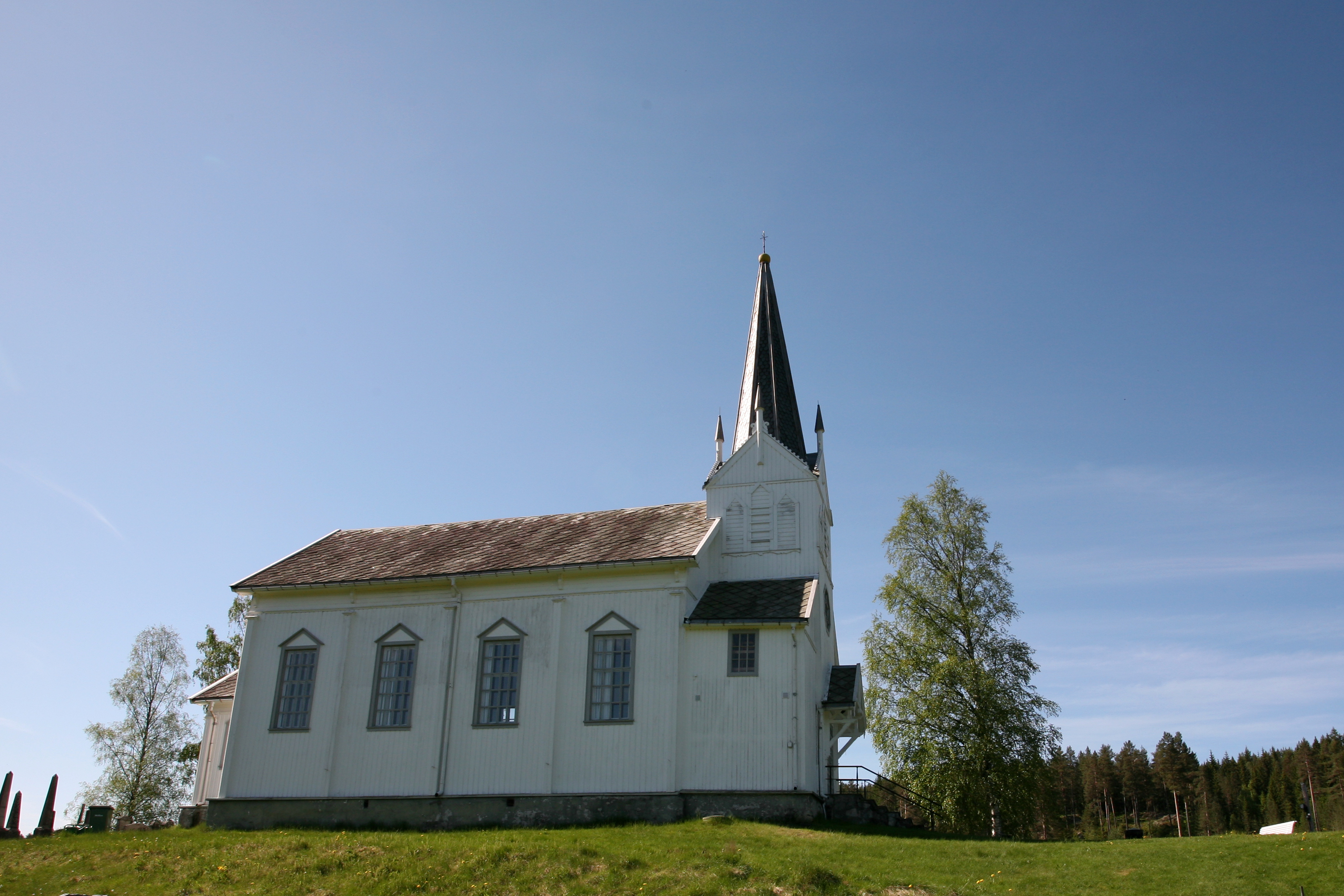
- View of the church
- Lisleherad Church
- 59°36′54″N 9°15′51″E
- Location: Notodden Municipality, Telemark
- Country: Norway
- Denomination: Church of Norway
- Previous denomination: Catholic Church
- Churchmanship: Evangelical Lutheran

History
- Status: Parish church
- Founded: 13th century

Architecture
- Functional status: Active
- Architect: Jacob Wilhelm Nordan
- Architectural type: Long church
- Completed: 1873 (153 years ago)

Specifications
- Capacity: 140
- Materials: Wood

Administration
- Diocese: Agder og Telemark
- Deanery: Øvre Telemark prosti
- Parish: Lisleherad
- Norwegian Cultural Heritage Site
- Type: Church
- Status: Not protected
- ID: 84310

Lisleherad Church (Norwegian: Lisleherad kirke) is a parish church of the Church of Norway in Notodden Municipality in Telemark county, Norway. It is located in the village of Landsverk. It is the church for the Lisleherad parish which is part of the Øvre Telemark prosti (deanery) in the Diocese of Agder og Telemark. The white, wooden church was built in a long church design in 1873 using plans drawn up by the architect Jacob Wilhelm Nordan. The church seats about 140 people.

== History ==
The earliest existing historical records of the church date back to the year 1427, but that was not the year it was built. The first church here was a small wooden stave church with a tower that was possibly built in the early 13th century (around the year 1200). The church is said to have been dark inside (like most stave churches), as it only had a few small leaded glass windows. It is said to have been tarred on the outside and it had two small bells which were rung with a rope inside the church. There was no sacristy and the priest used the same entrance as the congregation. Like other churches, it was sold at the Norwegian church sale in 1723. While the church was in Steinar Rygi's ownership (1737–1739), the nave was extended, as it was too small for the villagers. It was said to have been in good condition at that time. In 1811, the church was renovated, giving it a more modern look (and losing some of the character of a stave church).

After several centuries in use, the church was torn down in 1873 and replaced with a new building on the same site. The last worship service in the old church was held on 26 December 1873. The new log church was designed by Jacob Wilhelm Nordan and built by builder Bakke from Kongsberg. Construction took place in 1873–1876. The new building was consecrated in 1876. The new church was completed, but it did not receive an altarpiece until 1903 (prior to that, there was a simple cross on the wall). An organ was installed in 1908. The church got its present appearance through a thorough renovation and restoration in 1953–1954 led by Finn Krafft. The interior walls were paneled to cover up the timber-framed structure and the second floor seating gallery was rebuilt (a little smaller than before). Also, the chancel was made smaller, with a lower, vaulted ceiling so that there would be room around the choir to include room for a sacristy. Krafft also found the old pulpit from 1793 in the old stave church here and he installed it in the new church during this time.

== Media gallery ==
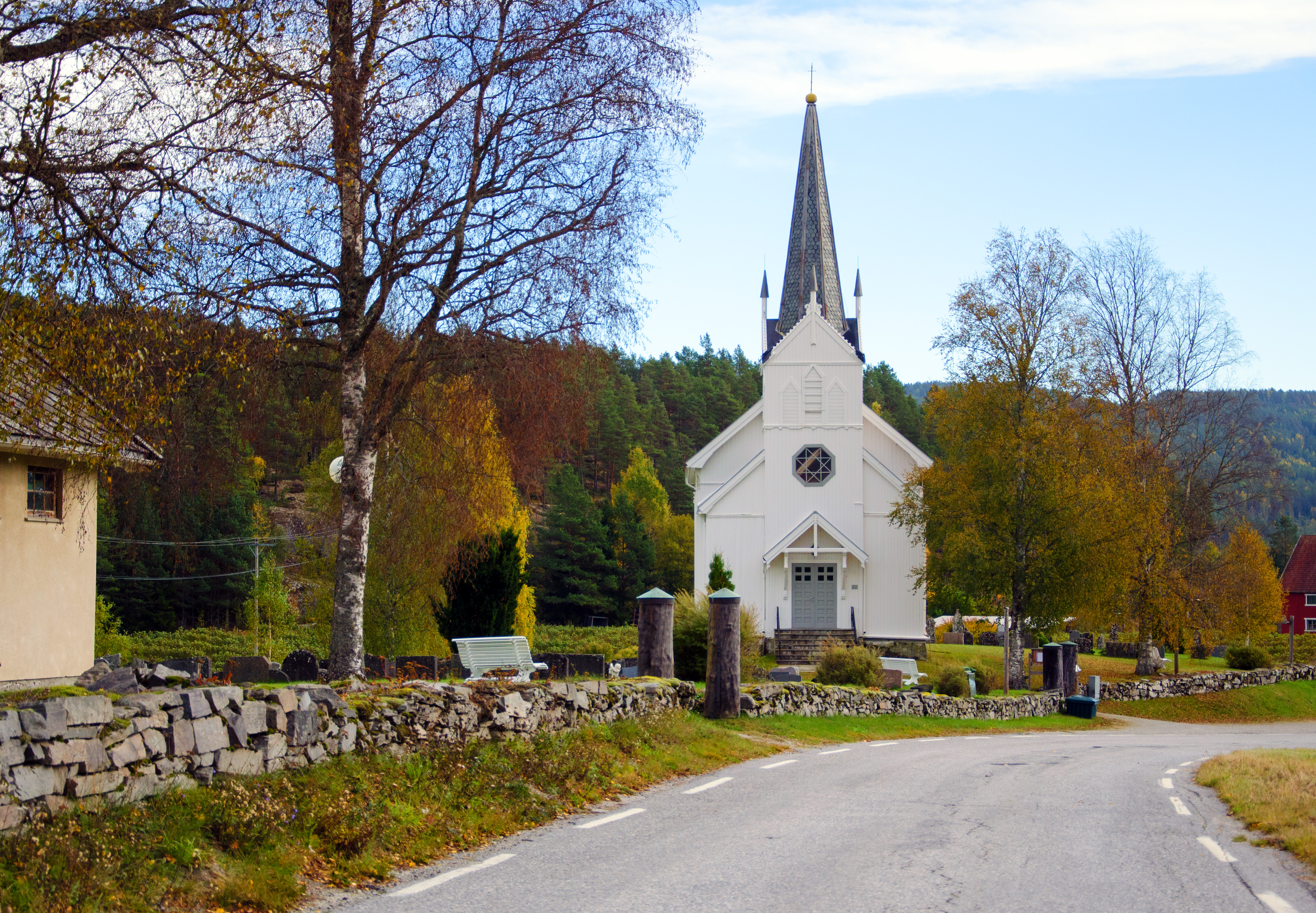

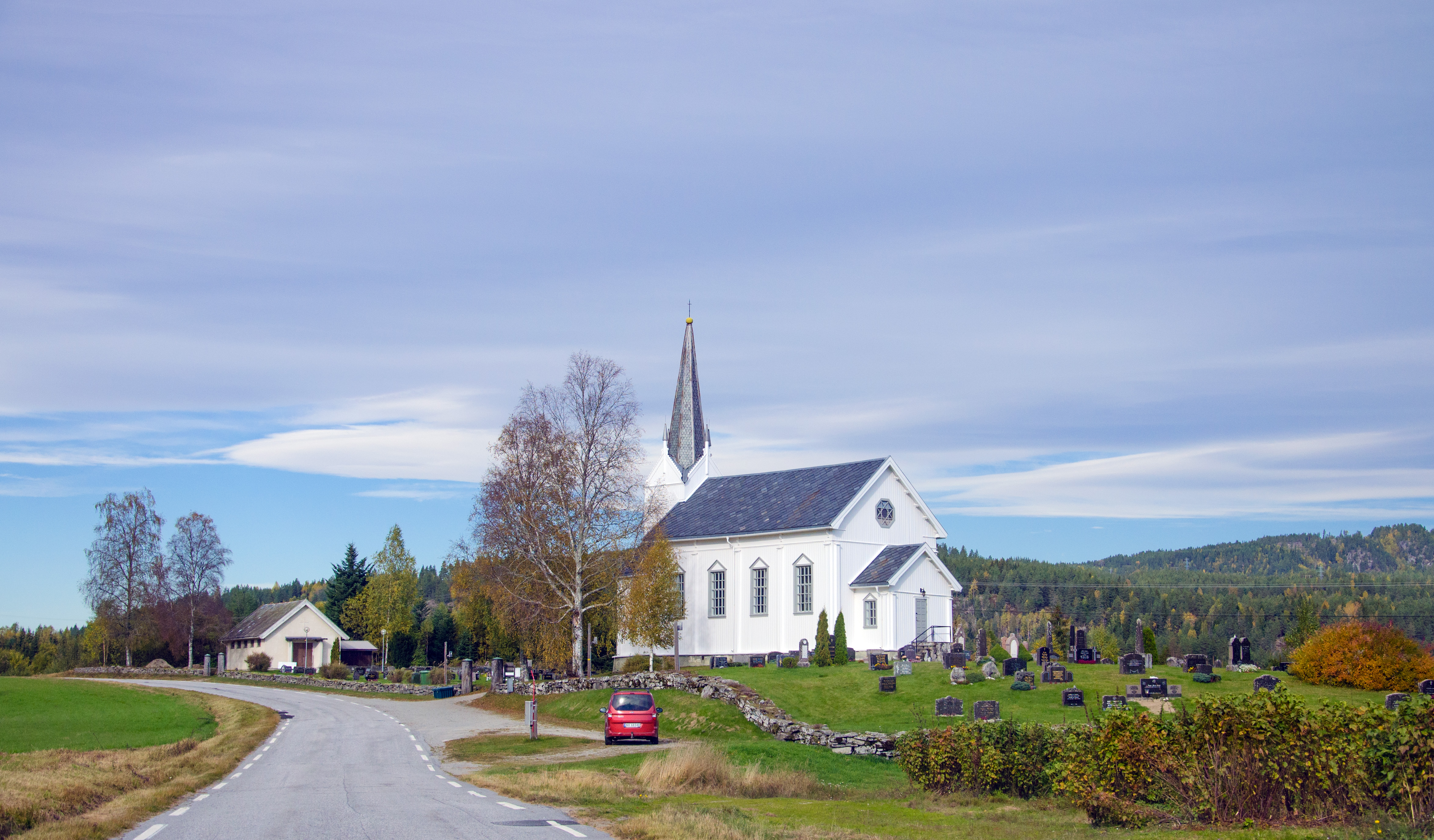

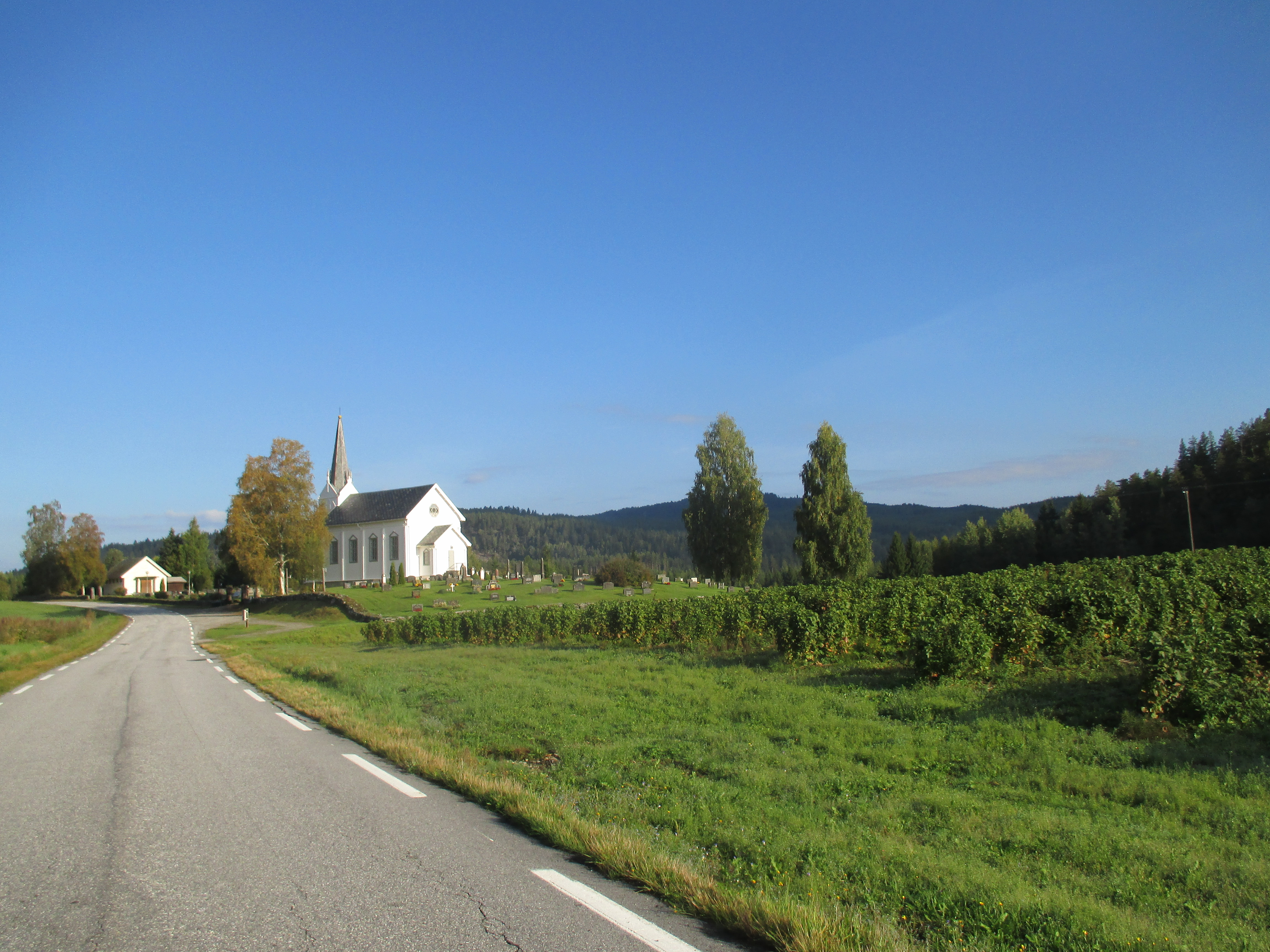

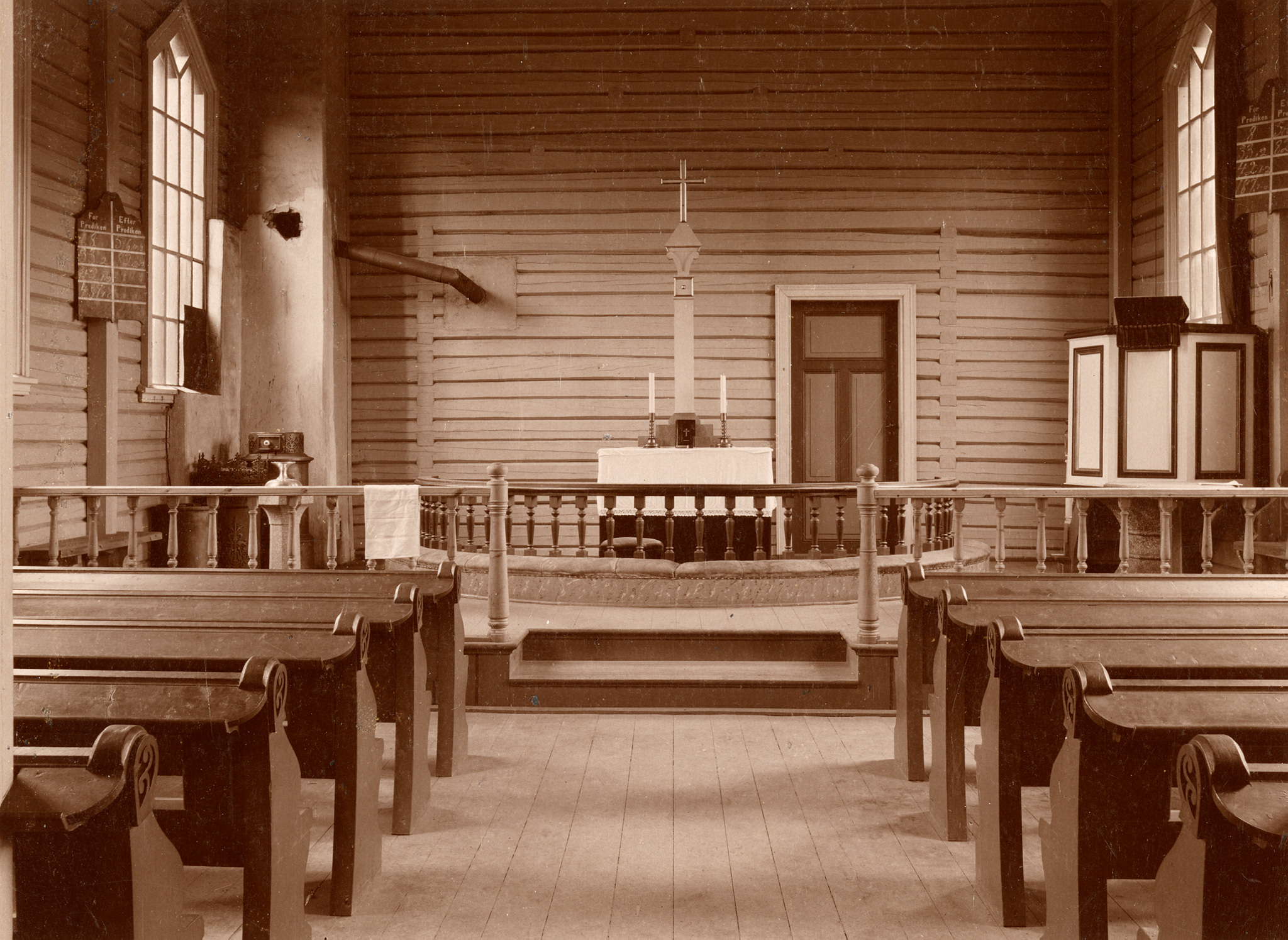
Interior view before 1902

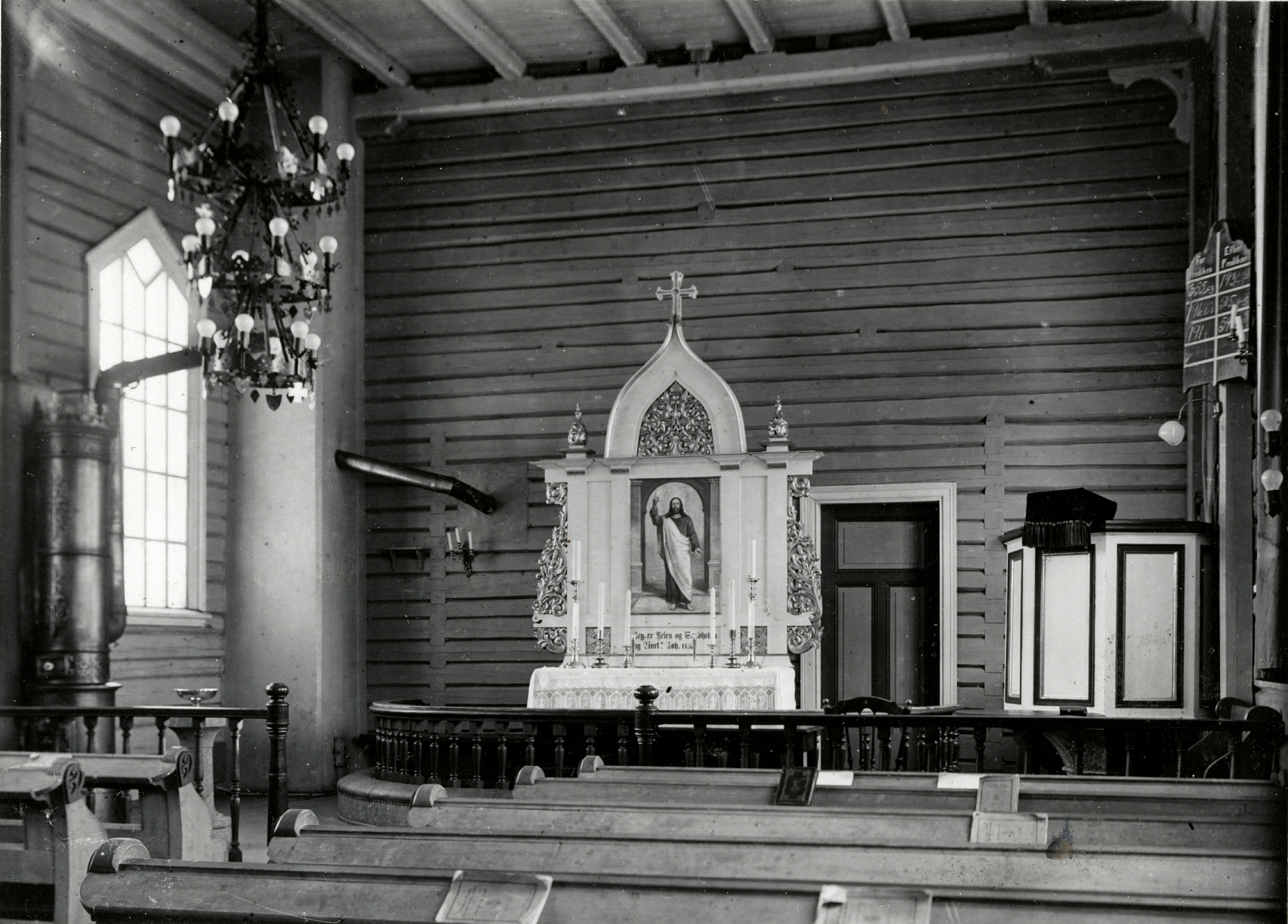
Interior view from 1903 to 1953

== See also ==
- List of churches in Agder og Telemark
