= Sauland =

Village in Hjartdal Municipality, Norway

- Village
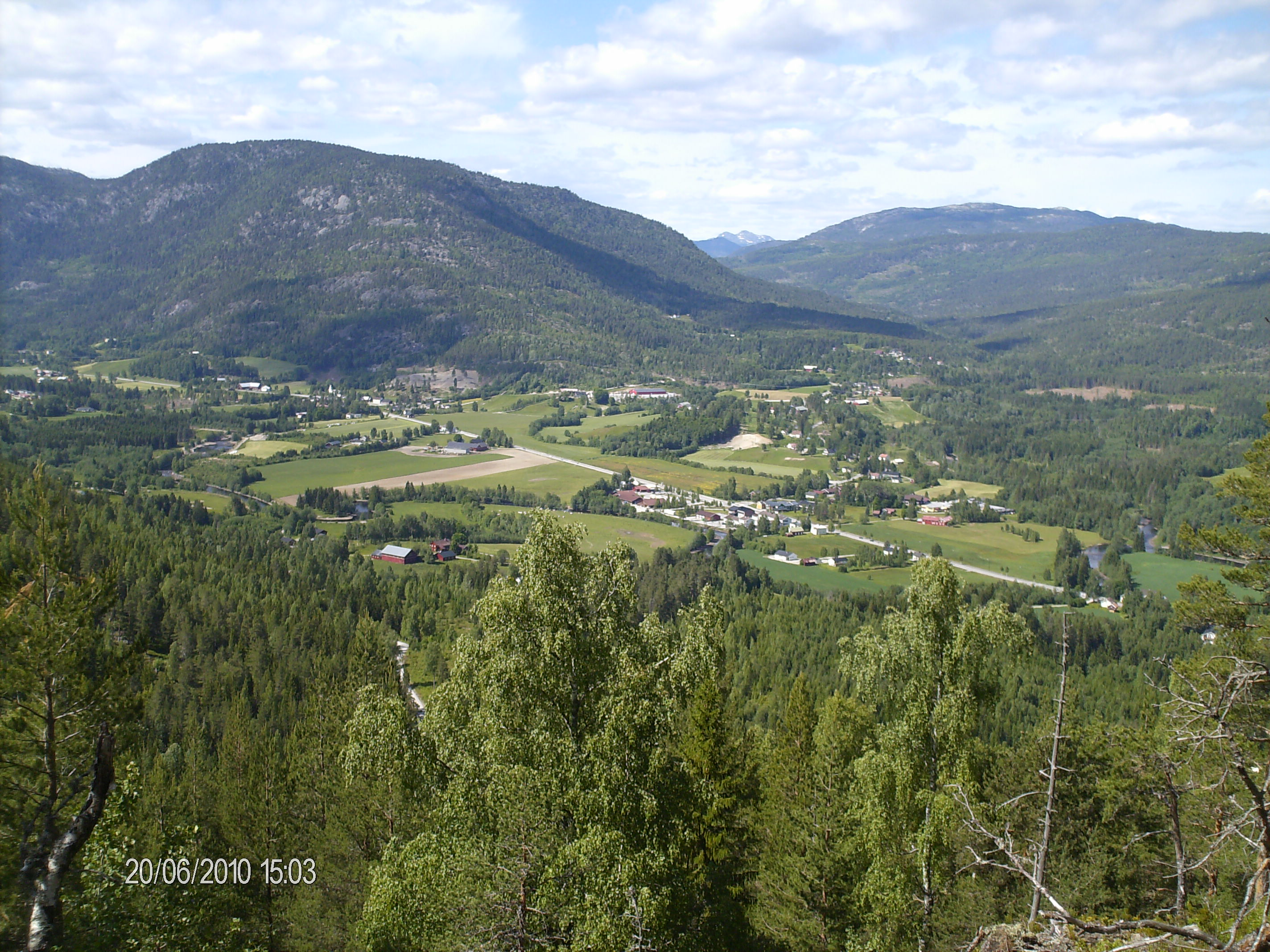
- View of the village
- Interactive map of Sauland
- Coordinates: 59.61902°N 8.93172°E
- Country: Norway
- Region: Eastern Norway
- County: Telemark
- District: Aust-Telemark
- Municipality: Hjartdal Municipality
- Elevation: 93 m (305 ft)

Population (2016)
  - Total: c. 800
- Time zone: UTC+01:00 (CET)
  - Summer (DST): UTC+02:00 (CEST)
- Post Code: 3692 Sauland

Sauland is the administrative centre of Hjartdal Municipality in Telemark county, Norway. The village is located at the confluence of the Hjartdøla and Skogsåa rivers, which together form the river Heddøla. The European route E134 highway runs through the village. The village of Hjartdalsbygda lies about 16 kilometres (9.9 mi) to the west, the village of Tuddal lies about 20 kilometres (12 mi) to the north, the village of Gransherad lies about 12 kilometres (7.5 mi) to the northeast, the village of Heddal lies about 15 kilometres (9.3 mi) to the east, and the town of Notodden lies about 20 kilometres (12 mi) to the east.

The population was above 800 people in 2016, which equates over half of all households in the whole municipality. The village is placed in the south/east corner of the municipality and is one of the three Church of Norway parishes in Hjartdal. The village has grocery store, gas station, crafts, auction and second-hand shop, bakery, doctor, day care, retirement, banking, guesthouses, municipal offices, social security offices, car and truck repair shop, wood and farm shop and a shooting range.

== History ==
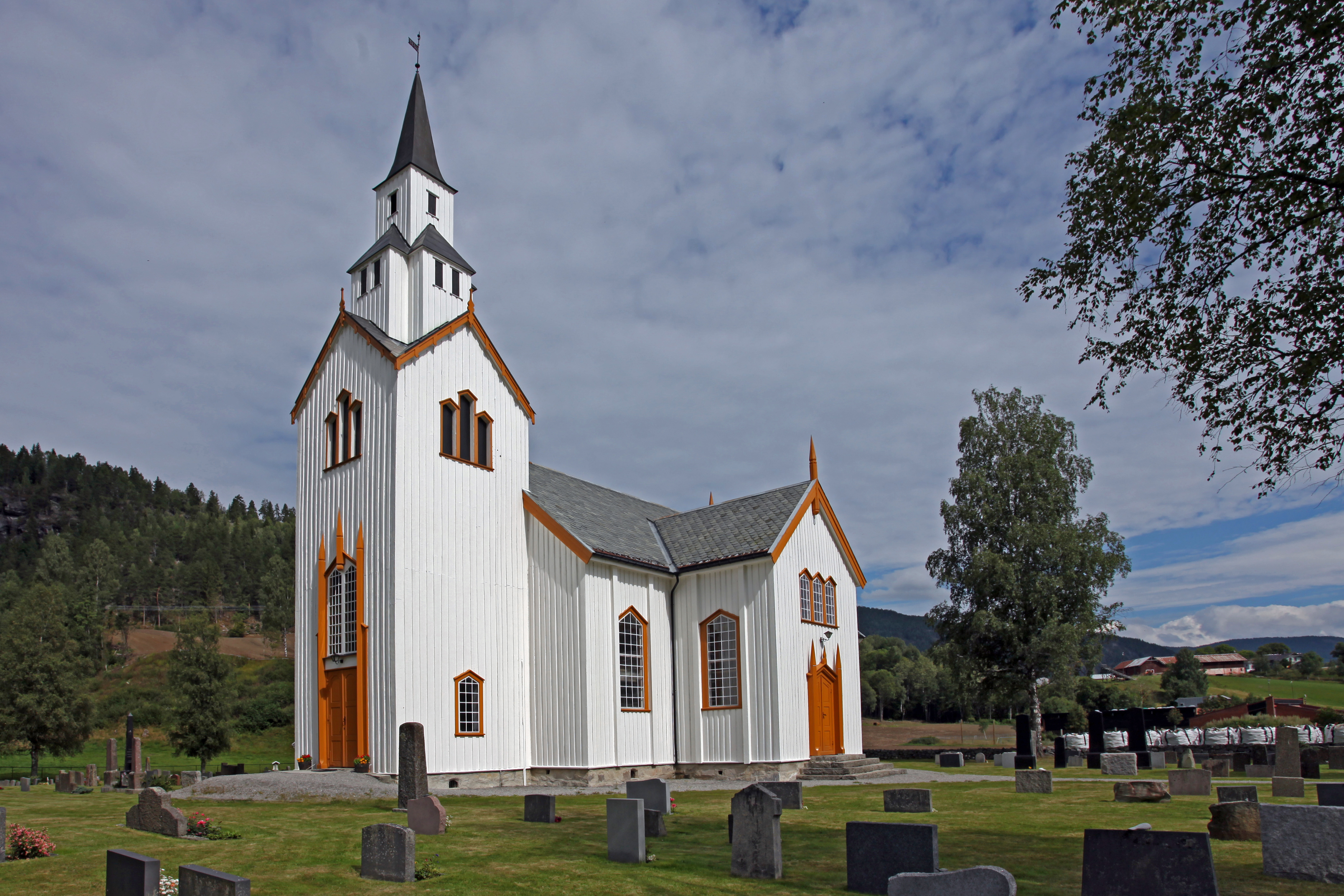
View of the local Sauland Church (2010)

Prior to the founding of the town of Notodden (town), Sauland was the commercial centre for Aust-Telemark, and at that time it also had the office for the district magistrate. The Sauland Church has been located in the village for centuries. In 1860 the old stave church was torn down and a new wooden church was built in its place.

=== Name ===
The village (originally the parish) is named after the old Sauland farm (Old Norse: Sviðulandir) since the first Sauland Church was built there. The first element comes from the verb svíða which means "to singe" or "to burn", likely referring to land that was cleared by burning. The last element is the plural form of land which means "land(scape)" or "district". Between the 17th and 20th century, the parish name had a variety of spellings such as Sourland, Souland and Saudland.

== Resources ==
Telemark's second largest moorland is located just east of Sauland. It is a place called Ålamoen, where gravel periodically is removed. Ålamoen's exploitable volume is 20,776 cubic metres (733,700 cu ft) and alternator contains 83,000,000 cubic metres (2.9×10^{9} cu ft) with masses. It is also among the largest in the country, which makes Hjartdal the second largest gravel-producing municipality in the county. The government is planning to establish a hydroelectric power station (Sauland power plant) that will be located in the mountain northwest of Sauland.

Sauland is also known for the discovery of mineral thulite, which is a manganese-rich red/pink variant of the mineral zoisite. It was first found type located between the farms Kleppen and Øvstebø, north of Sauland, where it was discovered about 200 years ago by the Swede Anders Ekeberg.

== Notable people ==
- Torgrim Mathiassen Kleppen (1849-1920), a politician and entrepreneur
- Torleiv Austad (b. 1937), a professor
- Anne Hytta (b. 1974), a folk musician
- Audhild Solberg (b. 1975), an author
- Sigrid Louise Gundersen (b. 1982), a television host
- Ellen Marie Løkslid (b. 1990), a singer
