= Tuddal =

Village in Hjartdal Municipality, Norway

- Village
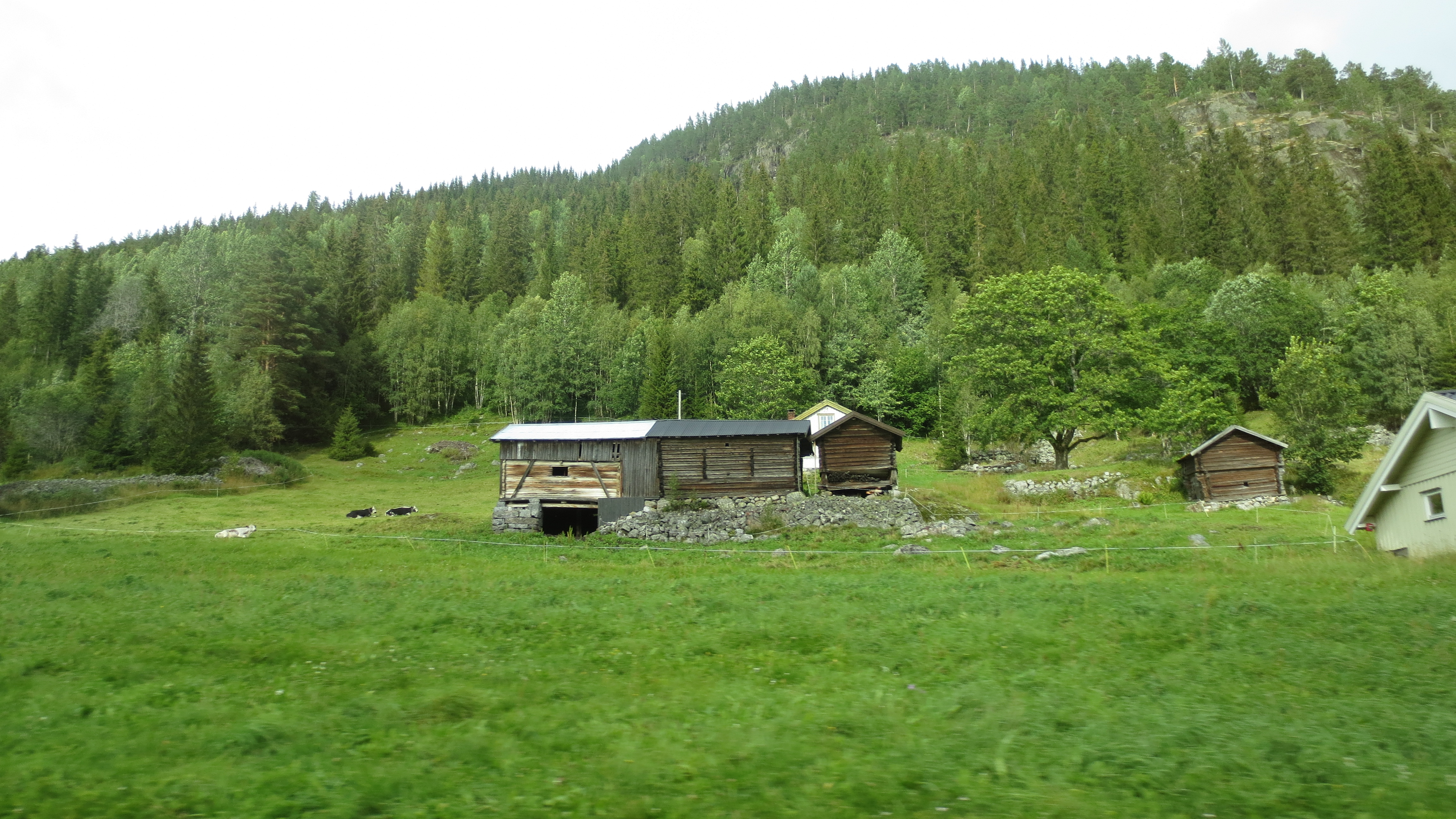
- View of a farm in Tuddal
- Interactive map of Tuddal
- Coordinates: 59.75336°N 8.79646°E
- Country: Norway
- Region: Eastern Norway
- County: Telemark
- District: Aust-Telemark
- Municipality: Hjartdal Municipality
- Elevation: 476 m (1,562 ft)
- Time zone: UTC+01:00 (CET)
  - Summer (DST): UTC+02:00 (CEST)
- Post Code: 3697 Tuddal

Tuddal is a village in Hjartdal Municipality in Telemark county, Norway. The village is located in the Tuddalsdalen valley, about 20 kilometres (12 mi) to the north of the village of Sauland and about 17 kilometres (11 mi) to the south of the town of Rjukan. County road 3430 runs from Sauland, through Tuddal, and further north along the mountain Gaustatoppen and to Rjukan. The highest point along the road reaches 1,260 metres (4,130 ft) above sea level. In the center of the village is Tuddal Church from 1796. In addition to this, there are many older and preserved farm buildings in the village too. Tuddal has many holiday cabins and great tourism, including the Tuddal Hotel.
