= Torbjørn Sletta Jacobsen =

Norwegian jazz musician and composer (born 1973)

- Born: 11 August 1973 (age 53); Oslo
- Origin: Norway
- Genres: Jazz
- Occupations: Musician, composer
- Years active: Saxophone
- Label: Curling Legs
- Website: www.tsj.no

Torbjørn Sletta Jacobsen (born 11 August 1973 in Oslo, Norway) is a Norwegian jazz saxophonist and composer. He has composed and produced music for television, radio, audio books and advertising in a variety of genres.

== Career ==
Jacobsen is a trained musician and music teacher, as a graduate of the Rhythmic Music Conservatory in Copenhagen 1995–1999, with diploma studies (2001). He has worked as a musician since the early 1990s, in a variety of contexts, based in Oslo, and also in Copenhagen.

Before starting his own Torbjørn Sletta Jacobsen Quintet in 2010, Jacobsen played in the jazz quintet Lobster (2002–08). As student in Copenhagen he collaborated in a number of big and small constellations from 1995, in addition to contributions on a number of studio recordings.

In addition to composing music for his quintet, he has made pieces for string quintet and percussion as accompaniment to fairy tales by H. C. Andersen (2005), background music for Marguerite Duras' "The Lover" (2005), and was the main composer and bandleader for the jazz quintet Lobster (2002–08).

As a saxophone teacher he has among other things been leader for the talent program at the Oslo Music and Culture school (OMK) from 2010, and saxophone teacher at The Waldorf College in Oslo (Oslo by Steinerskole) in the period 2005 to 2009.

Jacobsen leads a quintet on his debut album Time Layers (2011), where he collaborates with Gunnar Halle (trumpet), Espen Eriksen (piano), Thommy Andersson (bass) and Knut Aalefjær (drums).

== Discography ==
=== Solo albums ===
Torbjørn Sletta Jacobsen Quintet including with Thommy Andersson, Espen Eriksen, Gunnar Halle & Knut Aalefjær

- 2011: Time Layers (Curling Legs)

=== Collaborations ===
- 1995: Weld, Hello Walls (EMI/Parlophone)
- 1997: World Music From Denmark (Tocano)
- 1997: Bimwo Swing (Dacapo), Brande int. Music Workshop Orchestra, composed and conducted by Ray Anderson
- 1997: A Story of Multiplicity (Dacapo), Brande int. Music Workshop Orchestra, composed and conducted by Marilyn Mazur
- 2000: Everytime U Kiss me (I'll Be There) (Mind The Gap, MTG Music), within O'boylife
- 2000: Evolution (T-kay Records), with Sampeace Brown
- 2007: The Lesson (Schmell), with 'Norsk Kurveunion'

== Audio books ==
- 2005: Margerite Duras: "Elskeren", Lydbokforlaget 2005 (ISBN 82-421-1592-3)
- 2005: H. C. Andersen: Prinsessen på erten og andre eventyr av ..., Lydbokforlaget 2005 (82-421-1857-4)
- 2005: Hanne Hagerup & Klaus Hagerup: Skummelt, J.W. Cappelens Forlag 2005 (82-02-25007-2)
