= Hjartdal (village) =

Village in Hjartdal Municipality, Norway

Hjartdal Hjartdalsbygda
- Village
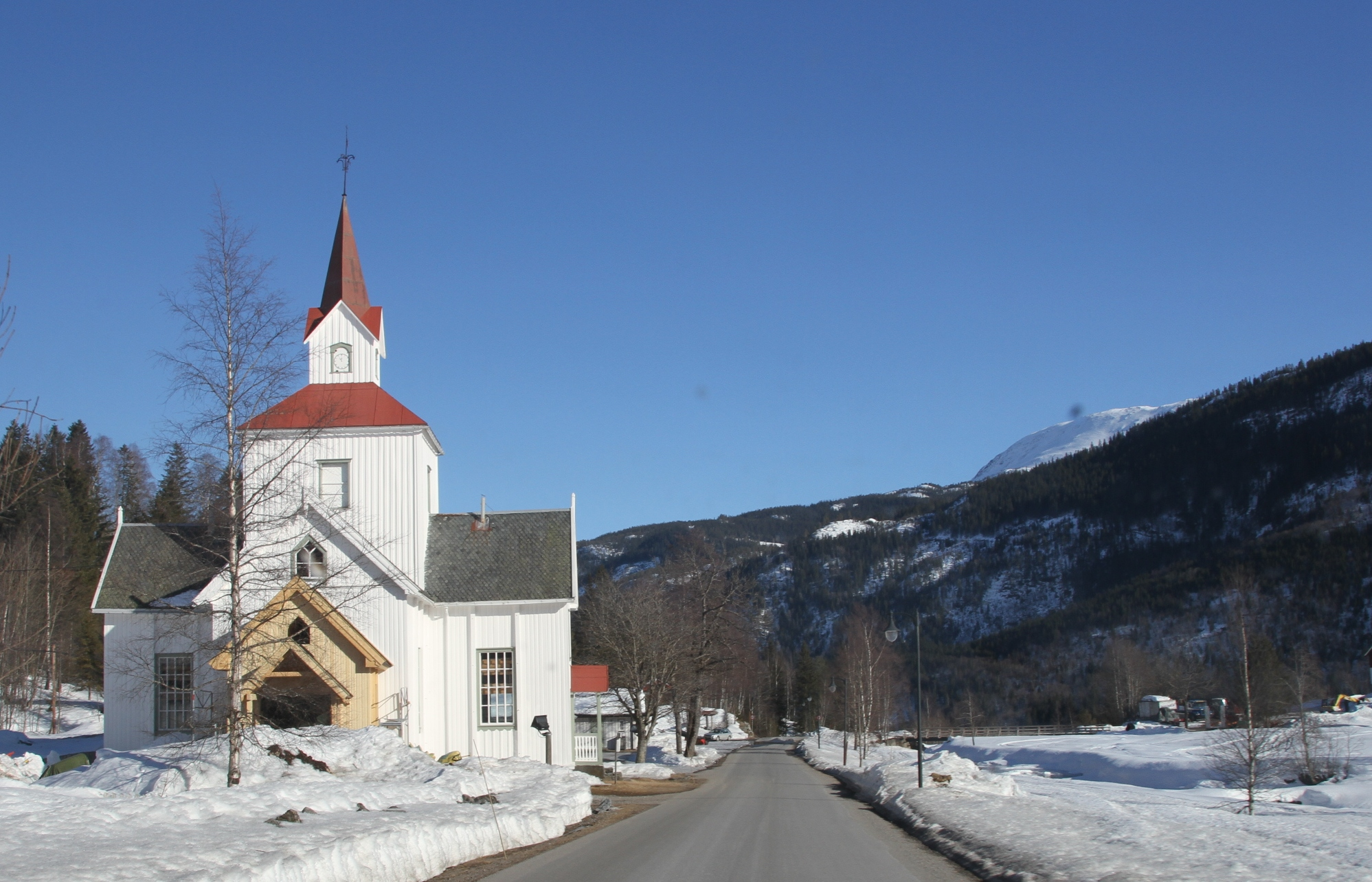
- View of the Hjartdal Church
- Interactive map of Hjartdal
- Coordinates: 59.60073°N 8.65317°E
- Country: Norway
- Region: Eastern Norway
- County: Telemark
- District: Aust-Telemark
- Municipality: Hjartdal Municipality
- Elevation: 209 m (686 ft)
- Time zone: UTC+01:00 (CET)
  - Summer (DST): UTC+02:00 (CEST)
- Post Code: 3690 Hjartdal

Hjartdal or Hjartdalsbygda is a village in Hjartdal Municipality in Telemark county, Norway. The village is located along the river Hjartdøla, just west of the Hjartdalsvatnet lake. The European route E134 highway and the Mælefjell Tunnel both pass through Gvammen, about 3 kilometres (1.9 mi) to the east of the village of Hjartdal. The village of Sauland lies about 16 kilometres (9.9 mi) to the east and the village of Flatdal (in Seljord Municipality) lies about 8 kilometres (5.0 mi) to the southwest. Hjartdal Church is located in this village.
