= Hjartdal Church =

Church in Telemark, Norway

- Hjartdal kyrkje
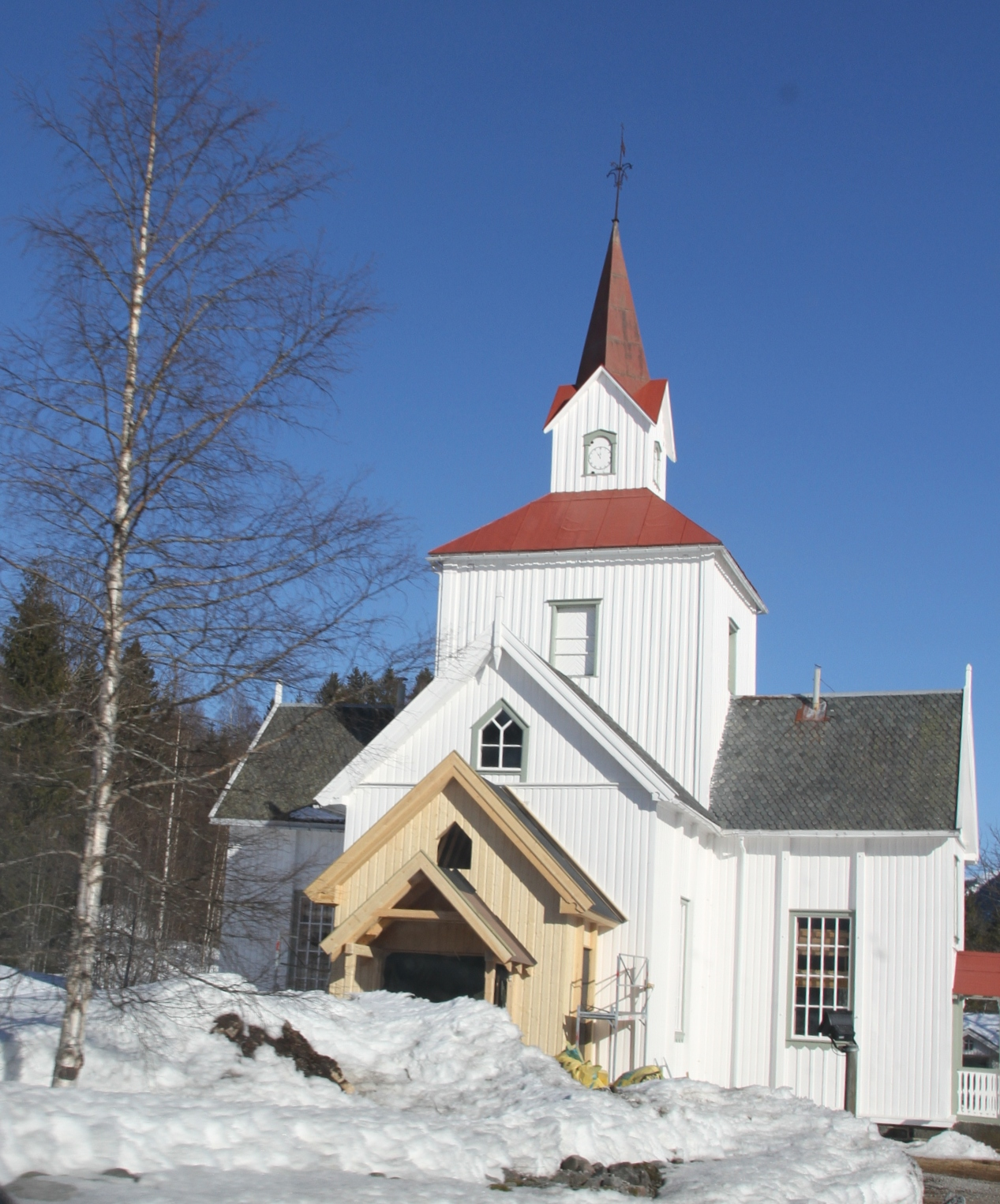
- View of the church
- Hjartdal Church
- 59°36′14″N 8°38′23″E
- Location: Hjartdal Municipality, Telemark
- Country: Norway
- Denomination: Church of Norway
- Previous denomination: Catholic Church
- Churchmanship: Evangelical Lutheran

History
- Status: Parish church
- Founded: 13th century
- Consecrated: 12 July 1812

Architecture
- Functional status: Active
- Architect: Jarand Aasmundson Rønjom
- Architectural type: Cruciform
- Completed: 1812 (214 years ago)

Specifications
- Capacity: 220
- Materials: Wood

Administration
- Diocese: Agder og Telemark
- Deanery: Øvre Telemark prosti
- Parish: Hjartdal
- Norwegian Cultural Heritage Site
- Type: Church
- Status: Automatically protected
- ID: 84581

Hjartdal Church (Norwegian: Hjartdal kyrkje) is a parish church of the Church of Norway in Hjartdal Municipality in Telemark county, Norway. It is located in the village of Hjartdal. It is one of the churches in the Hjartdal parish which is part of the Øvre Telemark prosti (deanery) in the Diocese of Agder og Telemark. The white, wooden church was built in a cruciform design in 1812 using plans drawn up by the architect Jarand Aasmundson Rønjom. The church seats about 220 people.

== History ==
The earliest existing historical records of the church date back to the year 1414, but the church was not new that year. The first Hjartdal Church was a wooden stave church that was located about 100 metres (330 ft) to the southwest of the present church site, a little closer to the river (this is where the present cemetery is located). This first church was known as the Holmskyrkja or Holm Church. The old church site was surrounded on three sides by the river Hjartdøla and the ground was so damp that the foundations rotted, and it was not enough to have stone slabs underneath. By the early 19th century, the centuries-old building was in very poor shape and the desire to repair the old church was minimal, so the parish decided to build a new church.

The new church was built further away from the river, but the cemetery down near the river is still used, and it is said that remains from the old church building can still be found there. The new church was designed by Jarand Rønjom along with the builder Halvor Høgkasin. The cruciform design had a choir in the eastern transept with a pulpit altar. Construction on the new church began in 1809, and the new building was consecrated on 12 July 1812. The old church was torn down afterwards.

In 1814, this church served as an election church (Norwegian: valgkirke). Together with more than 300 other parish churches across Norway, it was a polling station for elections to the 1814 Norwegian Constituent Assembly which wrote the Constitution of Norway. This was Norway's first national elections. Each church parish was a constituency that elected people called "electors" who later met together in each county to elect the representatives for the assembly that was to meet at Eidsvoll Manor later that year.

The exterior of the church today bears the mark of changes carried out in 1888, when the style was changed to Neo-Gothic/Swiss, the top of the tower was changed, and the church got small extensions at the doors.

== Media gallery ==
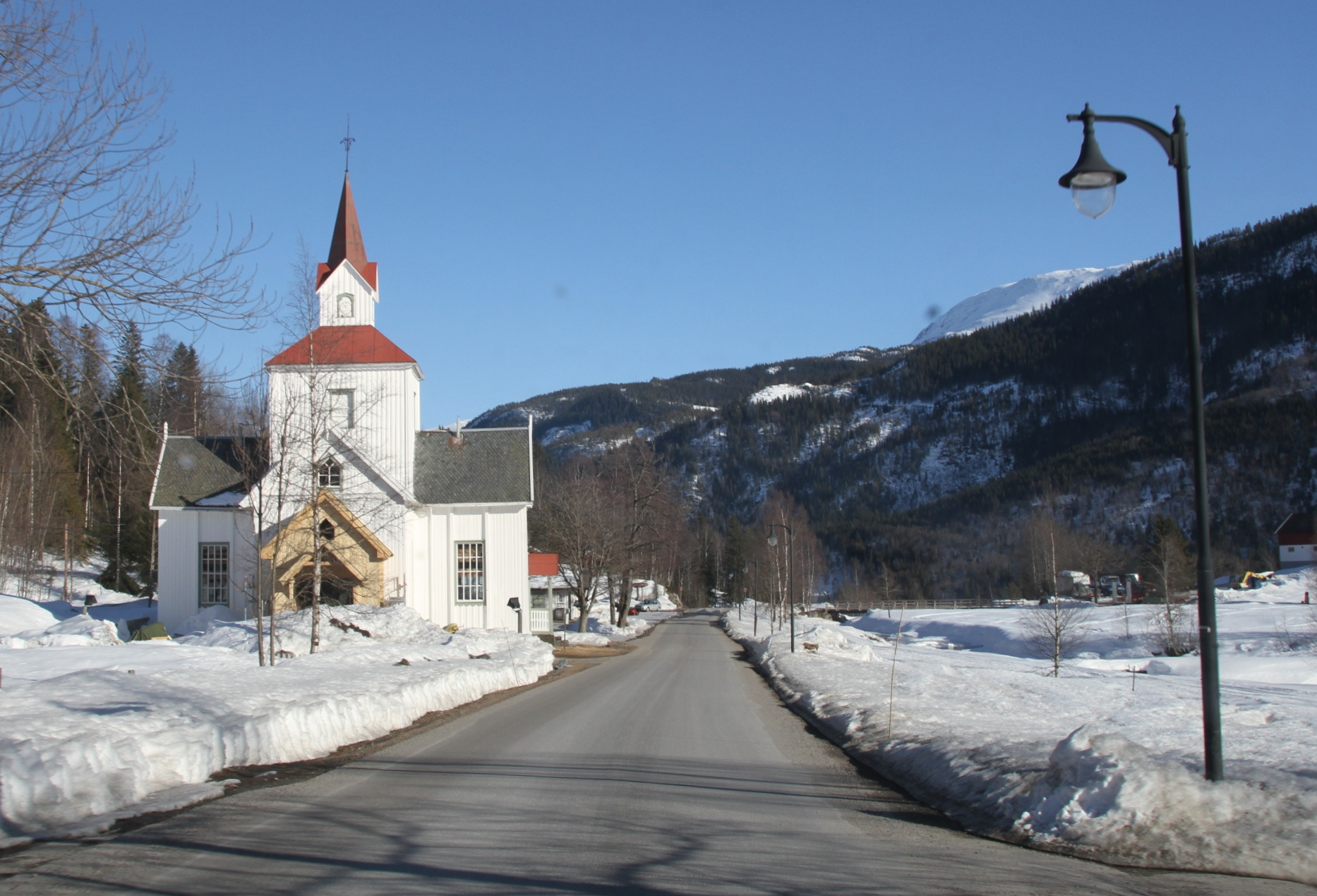

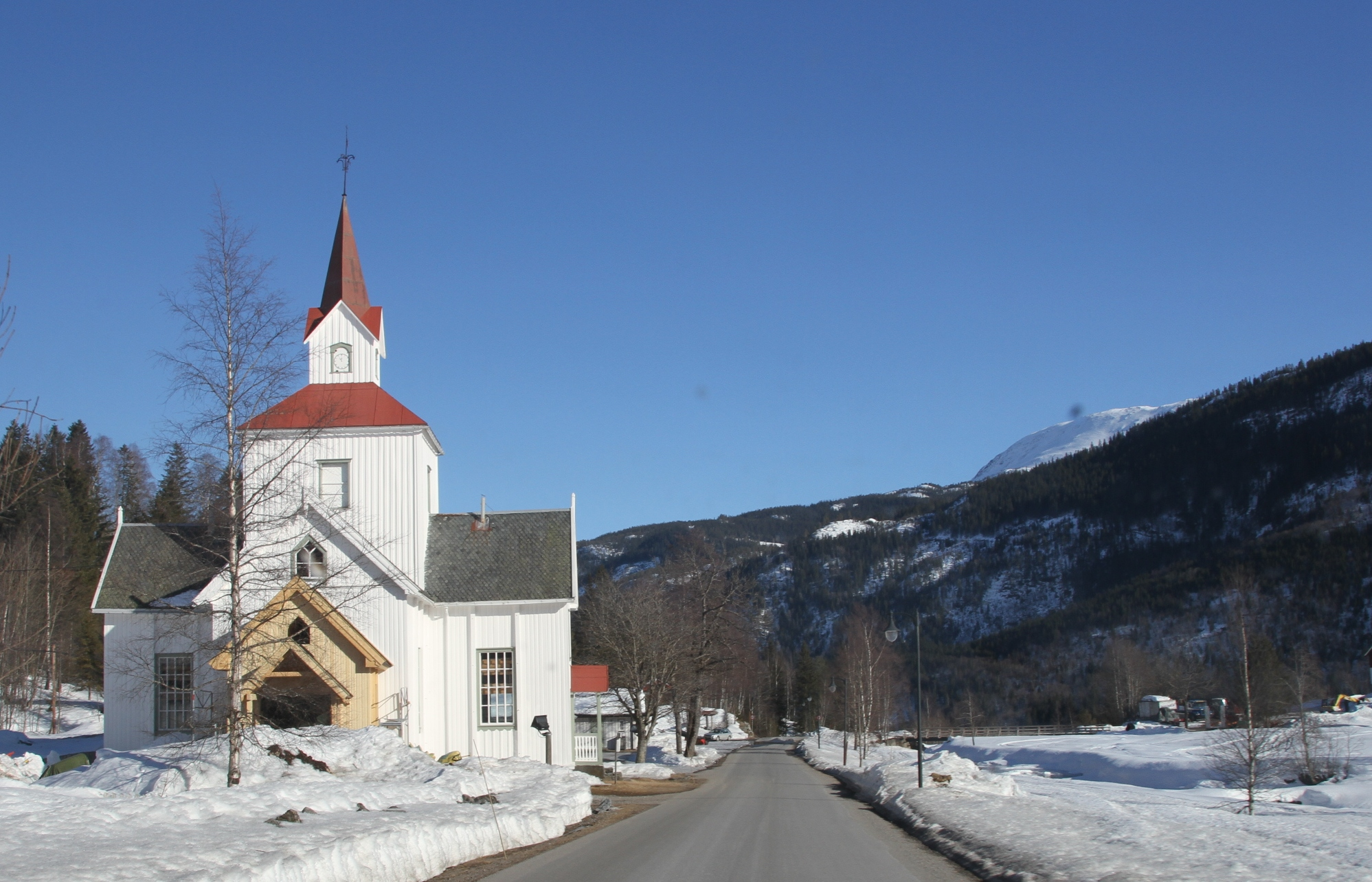

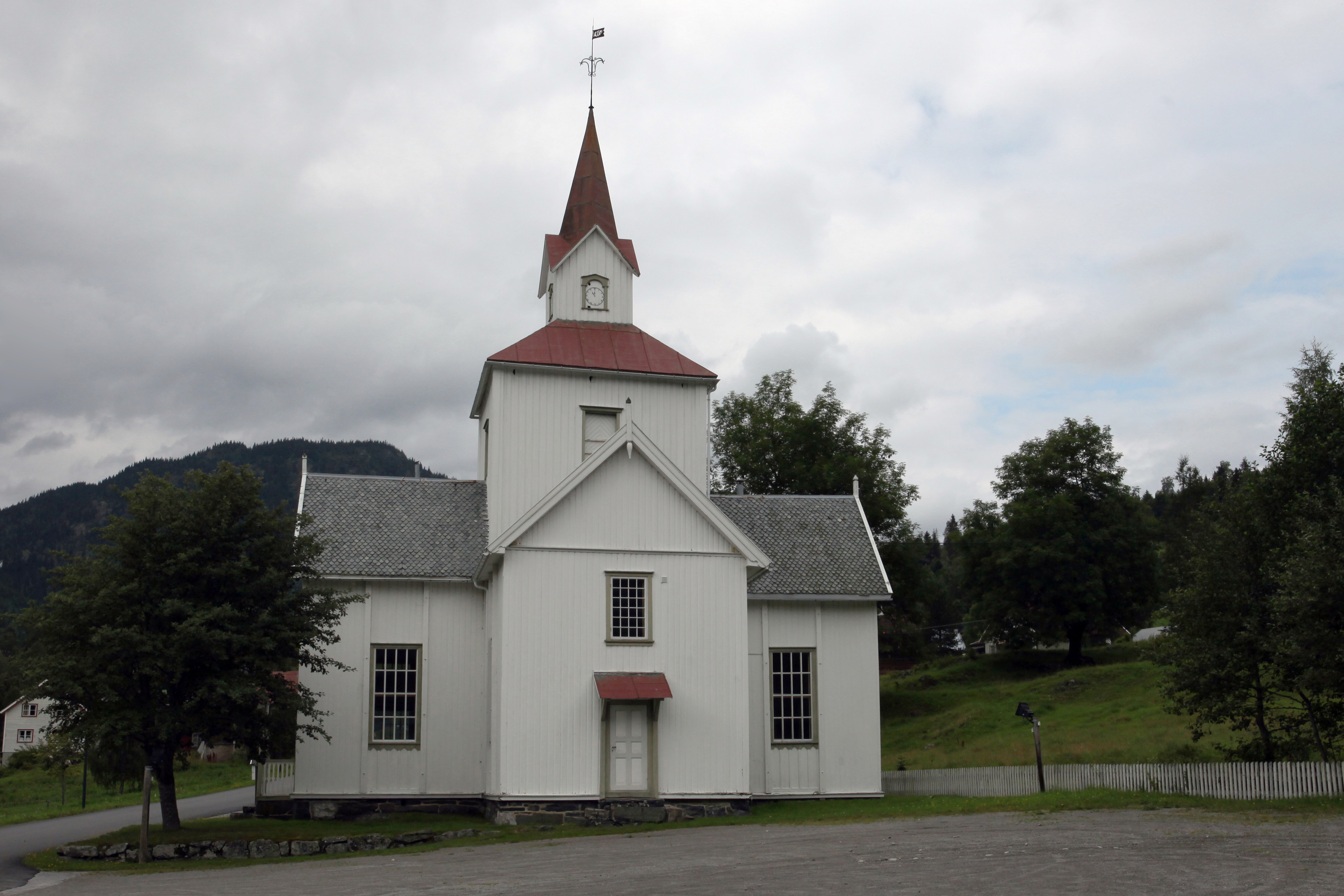

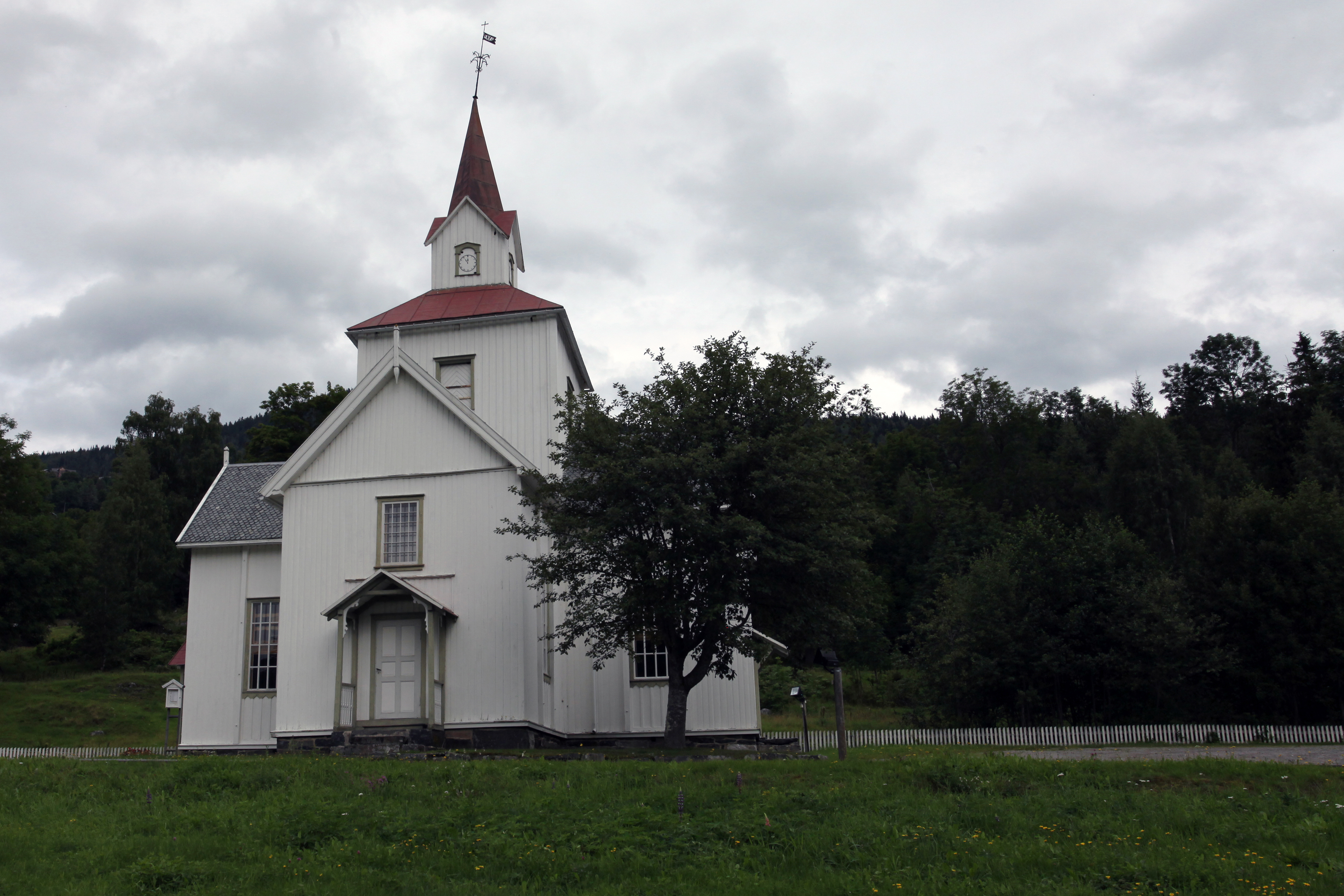

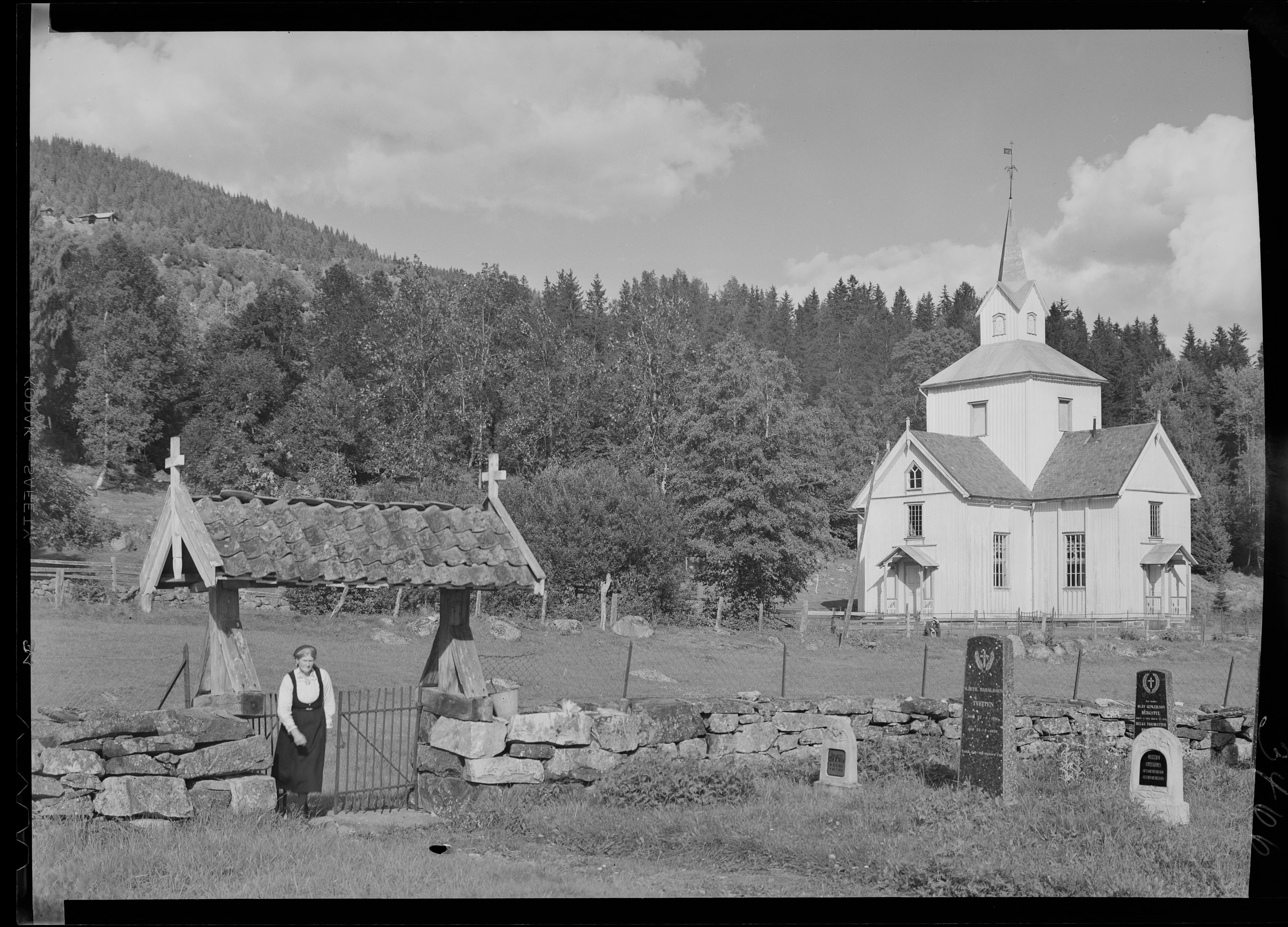

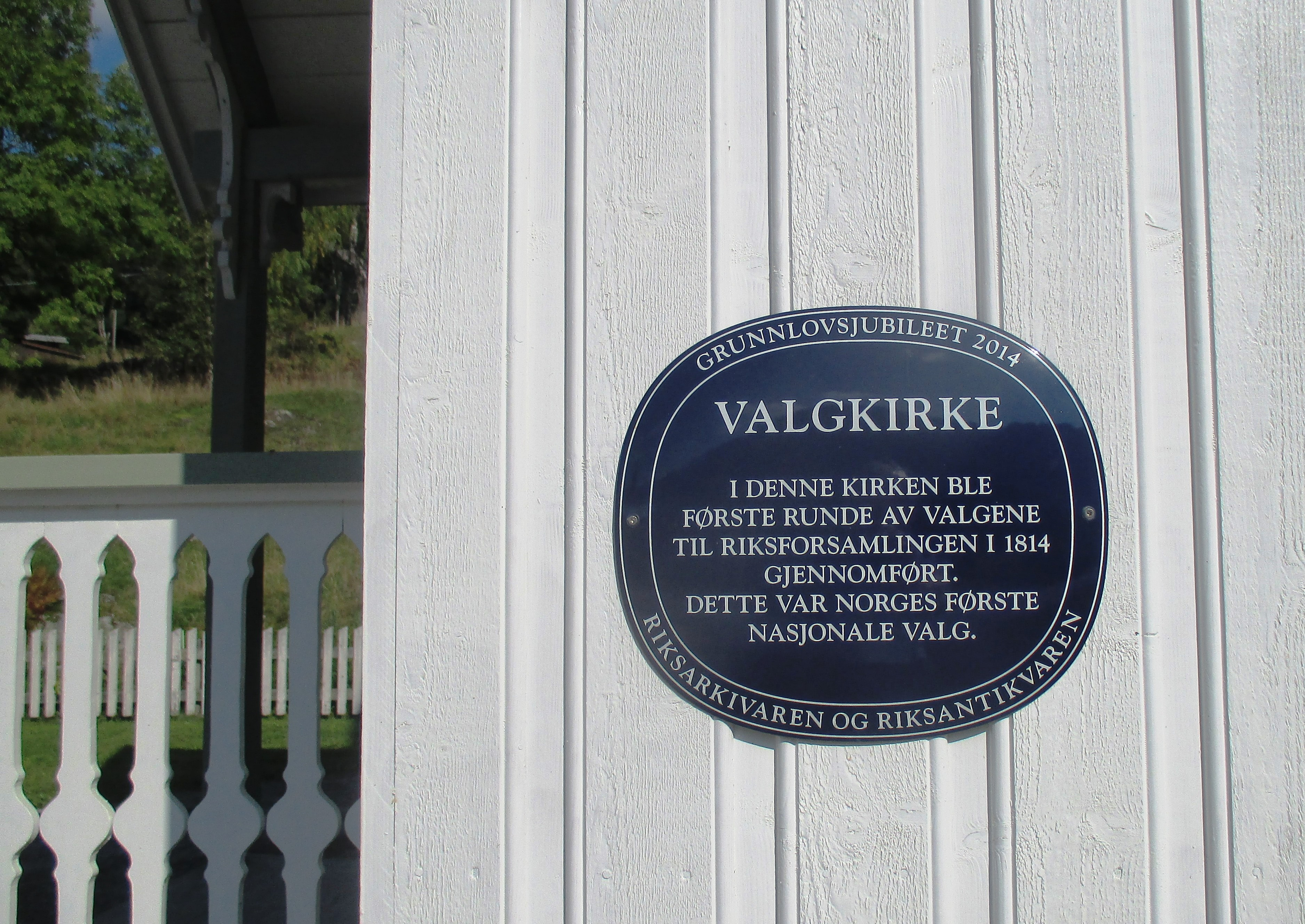

== See also ==
- List of churches in Agder og Telemark
