= List of World Heritage Sites in Norway =

World Heritage Sites in Norway. Green dots indicate the natural sites, red dots are cultural sites, while the blue dots indicate the sites of the Struve Geodetic Arc.

The United Nations Educational, Scientific and Cultural Organization (UNESCO) designates World Heritage Sites of outstanding universal value to cultural or natural heritage which have been nominated by countries which are signatories to the UNESCO World Heritage Convention, established in 1972. Cultural heritage consists of monuments (such as architectural works, monumental sculptures, or inscriptions), groups of buildings, and sites (including archaeological sites). Natural heritage consists of natural features (physical and biological formations), geological and physiographical formations (including habitats of threatened species of animals and plants), and natural sites which are important from the point of view of science, conservation, or natural beauty. The Kingdom of Norway accepted the convention on 12 May 1977, making its historical sites eligible for inclusion on the list. As of 2017, there are eight World Heritage Sites in Norway, including seven cultural sites and one natural site. There is one transnational site, the Struve Geodetic Arc, that is shared with nine other countries.

Norway's first two sites, Urnes Stave Church and Bryggen, were inscribed on the list at the 3rd session of the World Heritage Committee, held in Cairo and Luxor, Egypt in 1979. The latest inscription, the Rjukan–Notodden Industrial Heritage Site, was added to the list in 2015. In addition to its World Heritage Sites, Norway also maintains six properties on its tentative list, three of which are transnational nominations.

== World Heritage Sites ==
UNESCO lists sites under ten criteria; each entry must meet at least one of the criteria. Criteria i through vi are cultural, and vii through x are natural.

* Transnational site

World Heritage Sites
Site	Image	Location (county)	Year listed	UNESCO data	Description
Urnes Stave Church	Urnes Church, a wooden building with a cemetery in front.	Vestland	1979	58; i, ii, iii (cultural)	The stave church at Urnes is one of the oldest and most prominent examples of this type of wooden churches. It was built in the 12th and 13th centuries and incorporates elements of Viking tradition from the prior 11th century church. The church combines the influences of Celtic art, Viking traditions, and Romanesque architecture. The woodwork, originating from the previous church, depicts interlaced, fighting animals, and thus links the pre-Christian Nordic culture and the Christianity of the medieval ages.
Bryggen	Bryggen houses, look from the street.	Vestland	1979	59; iii (cultural)	Bryggen is the historic harbour district of Bergen, an important city on the West coast of Norway. In 1350, the Hanseatic League established a foreign trading post, a kontor, in Bergen, which controlled the trade in stockfish from the North. The Hanseatic period lasted until the 16th century. Bryggen's wooden houses were affected by many fires, the last one in the 1950s, but were always rebuilt in a traditional style. Around 60 traditional buildings remain today.
Røros Mining Town and the Circumference	Røros town panorama in winter.	Trøndelag	1980	55; iii, iv (cultural)	Røros was a copper mining town from 1644 until 1977, when the mining company went bankrupt. The town is built entirely in wood. It was completely razed by the Swedish troops in 1679 during the Scanian War but later rebuilt. Together with the surrounding area, the Circumference (the area of privileges awarded by the Danish-Norwegian King to Røros Copper Works in 1646), it demonstrates the life and work in a mining town in harsh sub-arctic climate.
Rock carvings at Alta	Alta petroglyphs depicting humans and animals	Finnmark	1985	352; iii (cultural)	This property contains 45 petroglyph sites in five areas around the Alta Fjord in Alta Municipality, far north of the Arctic Circle. Thousands of paintings and carvings, dating from approximately 4200 BCE to 500 BCE, depict circumpolar fauna, such as reindeer, elks, bears, fish, whales, and seabirds, as well as the interaction of hunter-gatherers with the landscape. The panels show hunting, fishing, boat journeys, and also symbols and rituals. Various artefacts of material culture are depicted as well.
Vegaøyan – The Vega Archipelago	Vega island panorama from the sea	Nordland	2004	1143; v (cultural)	Apart from being fishermen and farmers, at least since the 9th century, the inhabitants of the Vega Archipelago were harvesting eider down, the down feather of eider ducks. People built shelters and nests for the ducks that came here every spring and were protected during the breeding season, which allowed them to collect the down when the ducks and chicks left the nests. This tradition is still preserved in modern times. The cultural landscape includes fishing villages, quays, warehouses, farming landscapes, lighthouses, and beacons.
Struve Geodetic Arc*	Struve Geodetic Arc pillar in Hammerfest. There is a globe on the top of the pillar.	Finnmark	2005	1187; ii, iii, vi (cultural)	The Struve Geodetic Arc is a series of triangulation points, stretching over a distance of 2,820 kilometres (1,750 mi) from Hammerfest in Norway to the Black Sea. The points were set up in a survey by the astronomer Friedrich Georg Wilhelm von Struve who first carried out an accurate measurement of a long segment of a meridian, which helped to establish the size and shape of the Earth. Originally, there were 265 station points. The World Heritage Site includes 34 points in ten countries (North to South: Norway, Sweden, Finland, Russia, Estonia, Latvia, Lithuania, Belarus, Moldova, Ukraine), four of which are in Norway.
West Norwegian Fjords – Geirangerfjord and Nærøyfjord	Panorama of Geirangerfjord with some cruise ships in the fjord	Møre og Romsdal and Vestland	2005	1195; vii, viii (natural)	The two fjords are among the world's longest and deepest. They are classic examples of fjords, submerged glaciated valleys. The valleys rise up to 1,400 metres (4,600 ft) above sea level and extend up to 500 metres (1,600 ft) below it. The area also features a large number of waterfalls, glaciers, and glacial lakes.
Rjukan–Notodden Industrial Heritage Site	The building of the ammonia dioxide factory	Telemark	2015	1486; ii, iv (cultural)	The industrial complex in the towns of Rjukan and Notodden was established by the Norsk Hydro company in the early 20th century. Early hydroelectric plants provided power for industrial production of artificial fertiliser from nitrogen in the air, a new global industry.

== Tentative list ==
In addition to sites inscribed on the World Heritage List, member states can maintain a list of tentative sites that they may consider for nomination. Nominations for the World Heritage List are only accepted if the site was previously listed on the tentative list. As of 2025, Norway lists six properties on its tentative list.

Tentative Sites
Site	Image	Location	Year listed	UNESCO criteria	Description
The Laponian Area – Tysfjorden, the fjord of Hellemobotn and Rago (extension)*	Sea, surrounded by mountains	Nordland	2002	iii, v, vii, viii, ix (mixed)	This tentative site is the extension of the site already listed in Sweden. Laponia is populated by the Sami people who preserve the traditional way of life based on reindeer herding. In the area surrounding the Tysfjorden, there is a large Lule Sami community. Rago National Park is a wild mountainous area.
The Lofoten islands	Lofoten islands from above. Settlements and mountains.	Nordland	2002	iii, viii, ix, x (mixed)	The Lofoten are a group of islands north of the Arctic Circle, spanning 250 kilometres (160 mi). They consist chiefly of Precambrian rocks. Cod fisheries have been an important source of income since the pre-Viking times. The area is also an important habitat for animals, the bird cliffs on Røst and Værøy being especially famous.
Svalbard Archipelago	Houses in Longyearbyen, a snow-covered mountain in the background	Svalbard	2007	v, vi, vii, viii, ix, x (mixed)	About 60% of the Svalbard Archipelago is covered by snow and ice. The islands have been used as whaling stations and by miners for centuries, and now there are permanent Norwegian and Russian settlements. Since the nature is mostly undisturbed, it is an important habitat for arctic animals, such as arctic fox, reindeer, whales, seals including walrus, as well as Arctic char that lives in lakes and rivers. Many birds nest at Svalbard, including eider ducks and geese. The bedrock in Svalbard is rich with fossils.
Islands of Jan Mayen and Bouvet as parts of a serial transnational nomination of the Mid-Atlantic Ridge system*	Egg-oeja, a peninsula on the coast of Jan Mayen. Sandy beach with a cliff in the background.	Jan Mayen and Bouvet	2007	viii, ix, x (natural)	This is part of a transnational nomination covering the supramarine points of the Mid-Atlantic Ridge. Two islands, both volcanic, are Norwegian, other sites belong to Brazil, Great Britain, Portugal, and Iceland. Jan Mayen (an integral part of the Kingdom of Norway), in the Arctic, is a breeding site for large numbers of Greenland seals and hooded seals, as well as seabirds. Bouvet Island, a dependency of Norway, lies 2,400 kilometres (1,500 mi) south of the Cape of Good Hope and supports populations of macaroni and chinstrap penguins, but Adelie penguins have also been recorded to breed. It is a breeding site for Antarctic fur seals and Southern elephant seals.
Viking Monuments and Sites / Vestfold Ship Burials and Hyllestad Quernstone Quarries*	Viking ship inside the museum	Vestfold, Vestland	2011	iii (cultural)	This transnational nomination lists nine sites in six countries, connected to the legacy of the Viking culture between the 8th and 12th century. Two sites are in Norway. The Vestfold site covers three ship burials and several burial mounds. The Hyllestad quarries produced quernstones (millstones), first for the use of the locals and later for export.
Várjjat Siida	Museum in Northern Norway	Finnmark	2025	iii (cultural)	This area on the Varanger Peninsula covers some of the earliest settlements of the late Ice Age period. Their distinctive features include religious and sacrificial sites, pit houses, and stone hunting systems.
