= Måna =

River in Telemark, Norway

Måna Måne
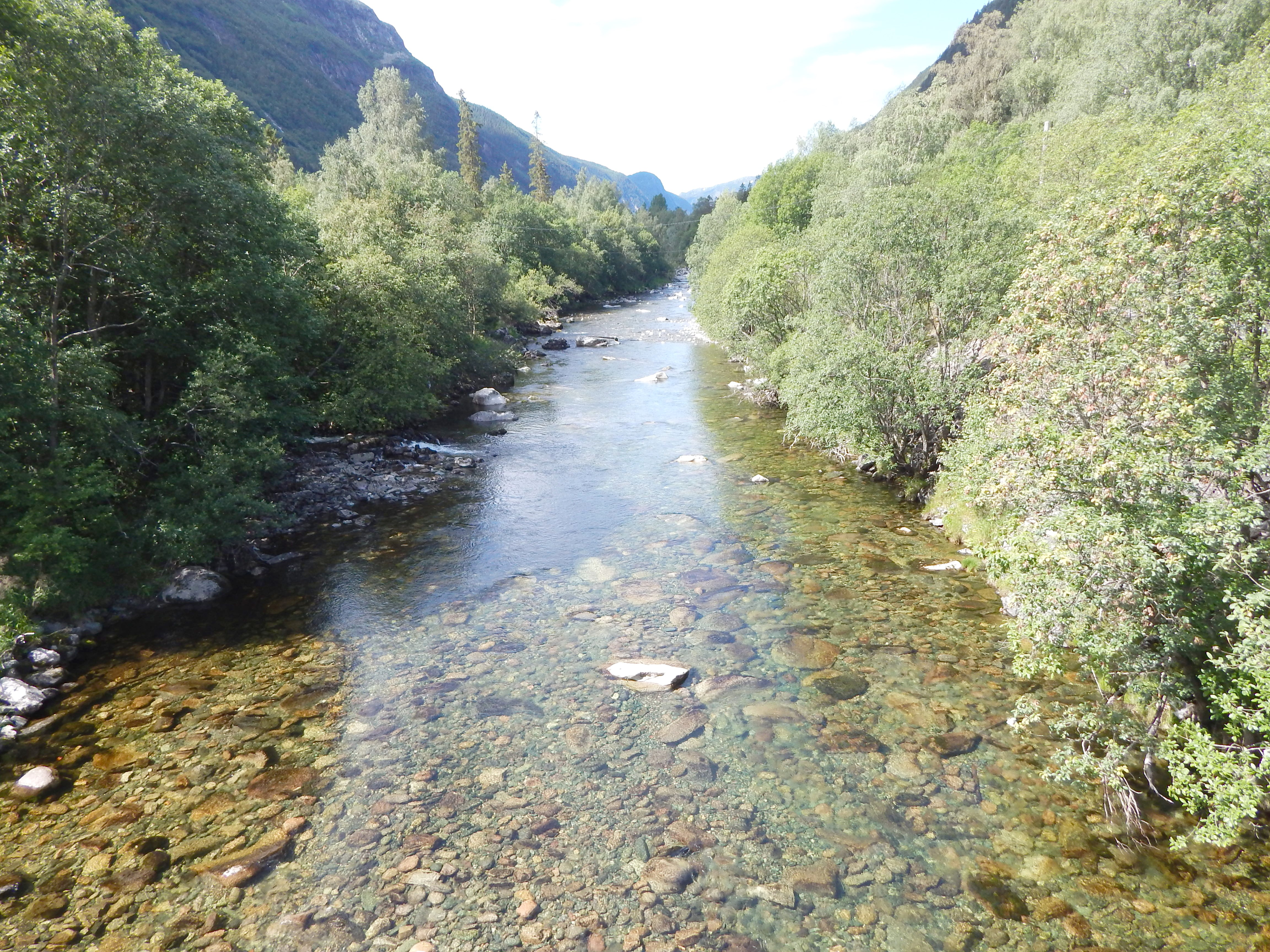
- The Måna River at Dale, east of Rjukan

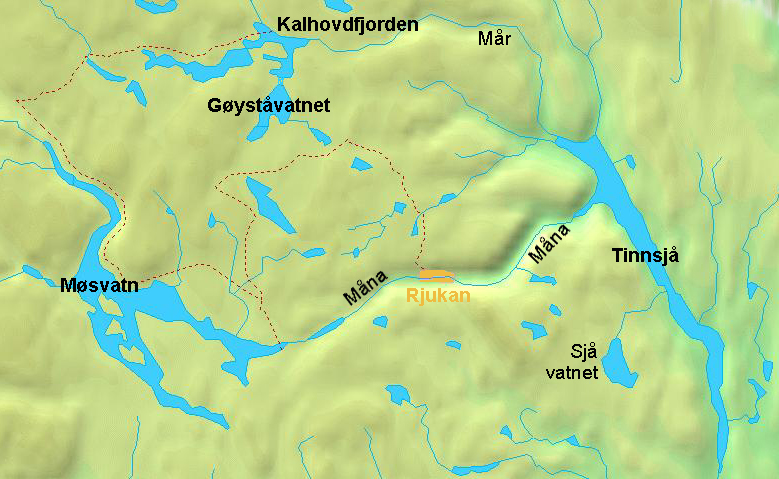
- The Måna River runs through Vestfjorddalen, from the lake Møsvatn to Tinnsjå

Location
- Country: Norway
- County: Telemark
- Municipalities: Tinn Municipality

Physical characteristics
- Source: Møsvatn
  - location: Tinn-Vinje border
  - coordinates: 59.824047°N 8.318066°E
  - elevation: 919 metres (3,015 ft)
- Mouth: Tinnsjå
  - location: Miland, Tinn Municipality
  - coordinates: 59.927796°N 8.799276°E
  - elevation: 191 metres (627 ft)
- Length: 32 km (20 mi)

Måna or Måne is a river in Tinn Municipality in Telemark county, Norway. The 32-kilometre (20 mi) river flows from the lake Møsvatn through the Vestfjorddalen valley and the town of Rjukan to the large lake Tinnsjå near the village of Miland. It is part of the Skiensvassdraget drainage basin.

The entire river has a total drop in elevation of 727 metres (2,385 ft) from Møsvatn to Tinnsjå, notably including the Rjukan Falls, a large waterfall that has also been a major tourist attraction. This area has been developed in five power stations with a total installation of 506 megawatts (679,000 hp) and a total average annual production of 2,237 gigawatt-hours (8,050 TJ). The largest power stations are Vemork and Såheim.

== See also ==
- List of rivers in Norway
