= Såheim =

Såheim may refer to:

- Fridtjov Såheim, Norwegian stage director, stage actor and film actor
- Såheim Hydroelectric Power Station
