= Miland =

Village in Tinn Municipality, Norway

- Village
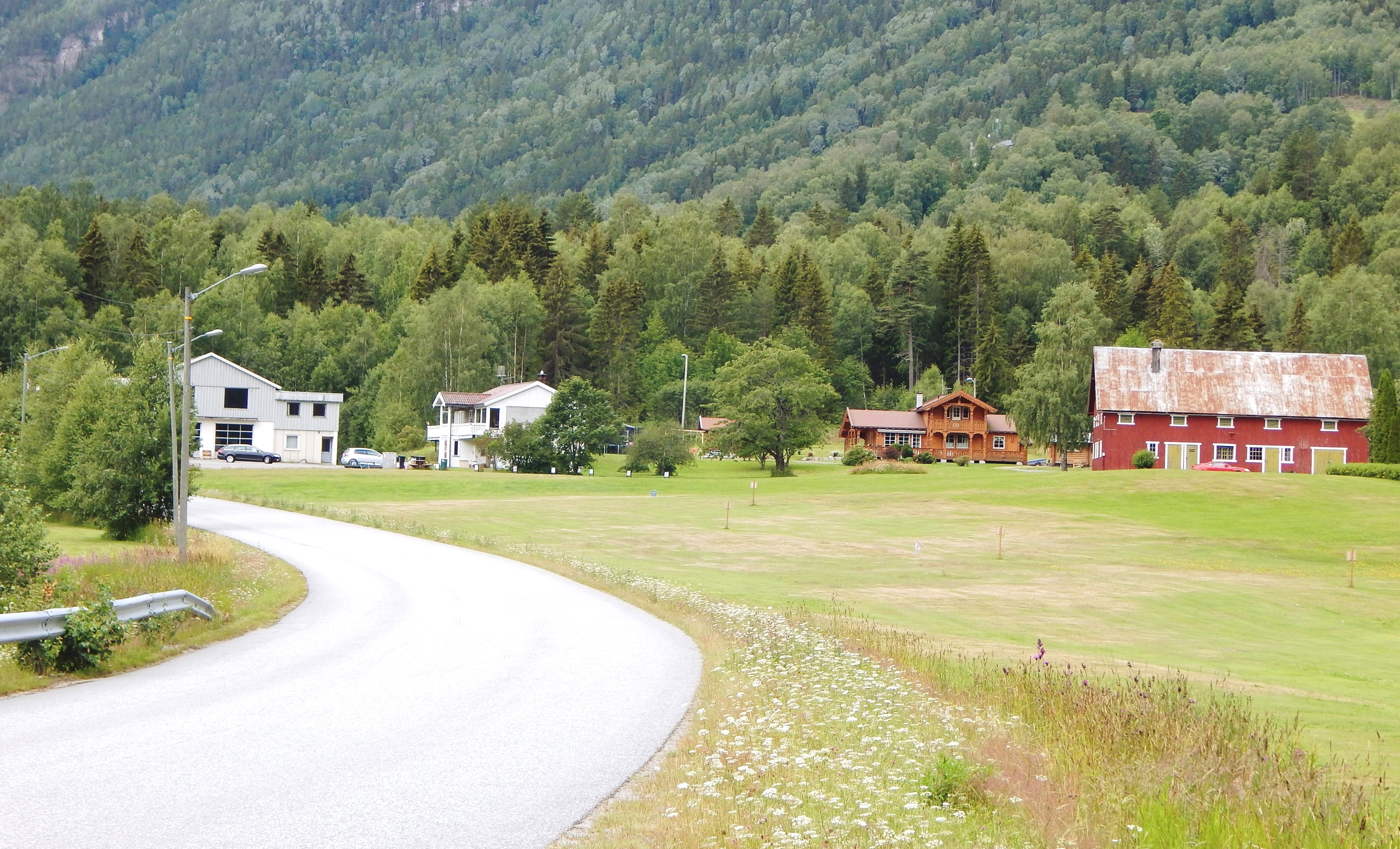
- View of the village Credit: Jan-Tore Egge
- Interactive map of Miland
- Coordinates: 59.9251°N 8.75359°E
- Country: Norway
- Region: Eastern Norway
- County: Telemark
- District: Aust-Telemark
- Municipality: Tinn Municipality

Area
  - Total: 0.37 km^{2} (0.14 sq mi)
- Elevation: 218 m (715 ft)

Population (2025)
  - Total: 329
  - Density: 889/km^{2} (2,300/sq mi)
- Time zone: UTC+01:00 (CET)
  - Summer (DST): UTC+02:00 (CEST)
- Post Code: 3658 Miland

Miland is a village in Tinn Municipality in Telemark county, Norway. The village is located in the Vestfjorddalen valley, near the western shore of the large lake Tinnsjå, about 11 kilometres (6.8 mi) east of the town of Rjukan, about 10 kilometres (6.2 mi) south of the village of Atrå, and about 10 kilometres (6.2 mi) to the southwest (across the lake) from the village of Austbygde.

The 0.37-square-kilometre (91-acre) village has a population (2025) of 329 and a population density of 889 inhabitants per square kilometre (2,300/sq mi).

The mountain Gaustatoppen lies about 10 kilometres (6.2 mi) to the southwest of Miland. The river Måna runs along the south side of the village on its way to the lake Tinnsjå. Mæl Church is located just east of the village.
