= Mæl Church =

Church in Telemark, Norway

- Mæl kirke
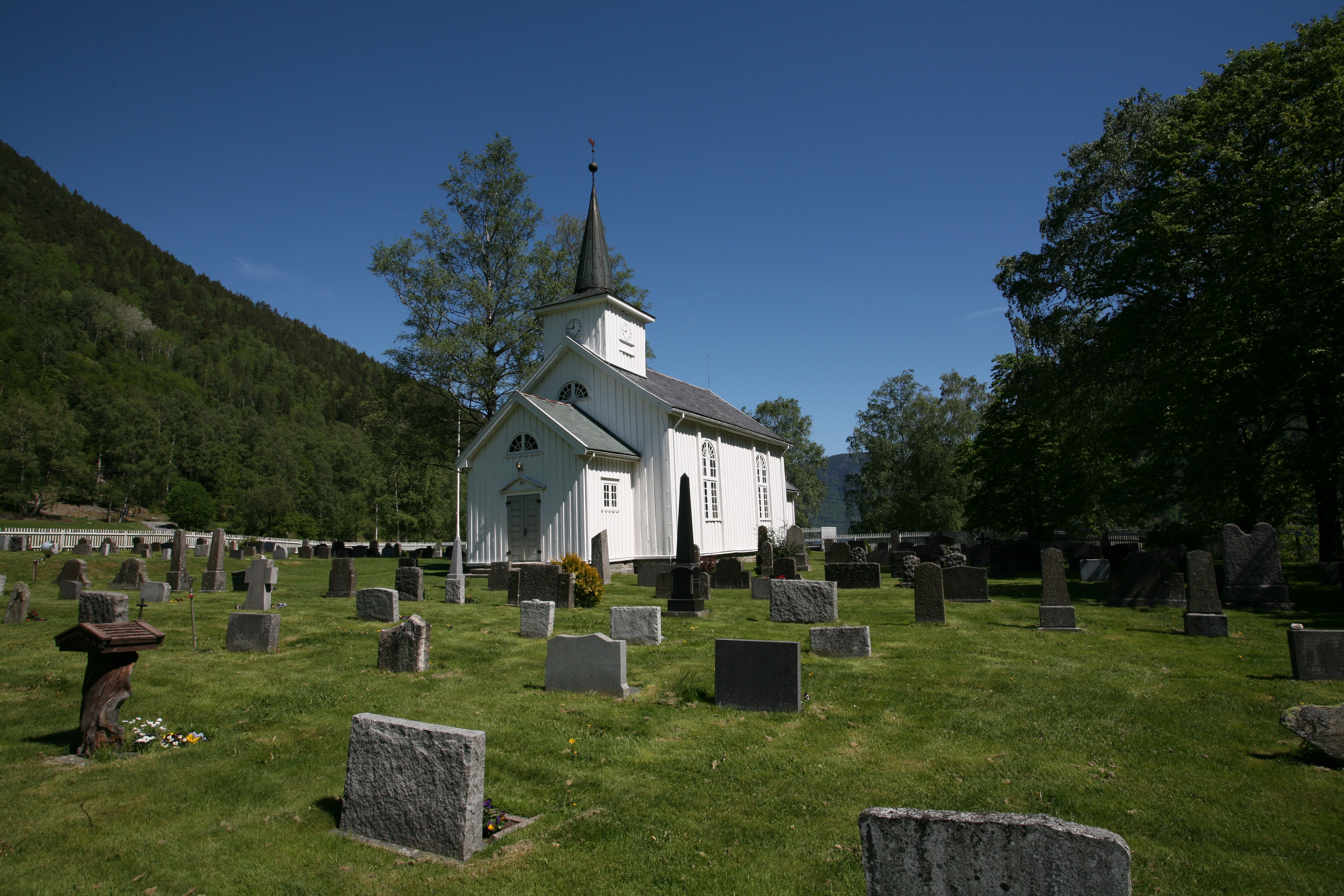
- View of the church
- Mæl Church
- 59°55′44″N 8°47′34″E
- Location: Tinn Municipality, Telemark
- Country: Norway
- Denomination: Church of Norway
- Previous denomination: Catholic Church
- Churchmanship: Evangelical Lutheran

History
- Status: Parish church
- Founded: 12th century
- Consecrated: 25 August 1839

Architecture
- Functional status: Active
- Architect: Hans Linstow
- Architectural type: Long church
- Completed: 1839 (187 years ago)

Specifications
- Capacity: 120
- Materials: Wood

Administration
- Diocese: Agder og Telemark
- Deanery: Øvre Telemark prosti
- Parish: Tinn
- Norwegian Cultural Heritage Site
- Type: Church
- Status: Automatically protected
- ID: 85081

Mæl Church (Norwegian: Mæl kirke) is a parish church of the Church of Norway in Tinn Municipality in Telemark county, Norway. It is located in the village of Miland. It is one of the churches for the Tinn parish which is part of the Øvre Telemark prosti (deanery) in the Diocese of Agder og Telemark. The white, wooden church was built in a long church design in 1839 using plans drawn up by the architect Hans Linstow. The church seats about 120 people.

== History ==
The earliest existing historical records of the church date back to the year 1358, but the church was not built that year. The first Mæl Church was a wooden stave church that was likely built during the 12th century. By the early 19th century, the old stave church had fallen into disrepair and it was decided to replace the old church. A new church was built immediately north of the old church by master builder Gunleik Ingolfsland who based it off drawings by the architect Hans Linstow. The church was consecrated on 25 August 1839 after three years of construction. After the new church was put into use, the old stave church was demolished. Mæl church is a snall, wooden long church. In 1916-1918, the church porch was rebuilt, a sacristy was added, and the church redecorated. Also there was a major restoration in 1973-1974 according to plans by Stephan Tschudi-Madsen, the interior colors were returned to the original.

== Media gallery ==
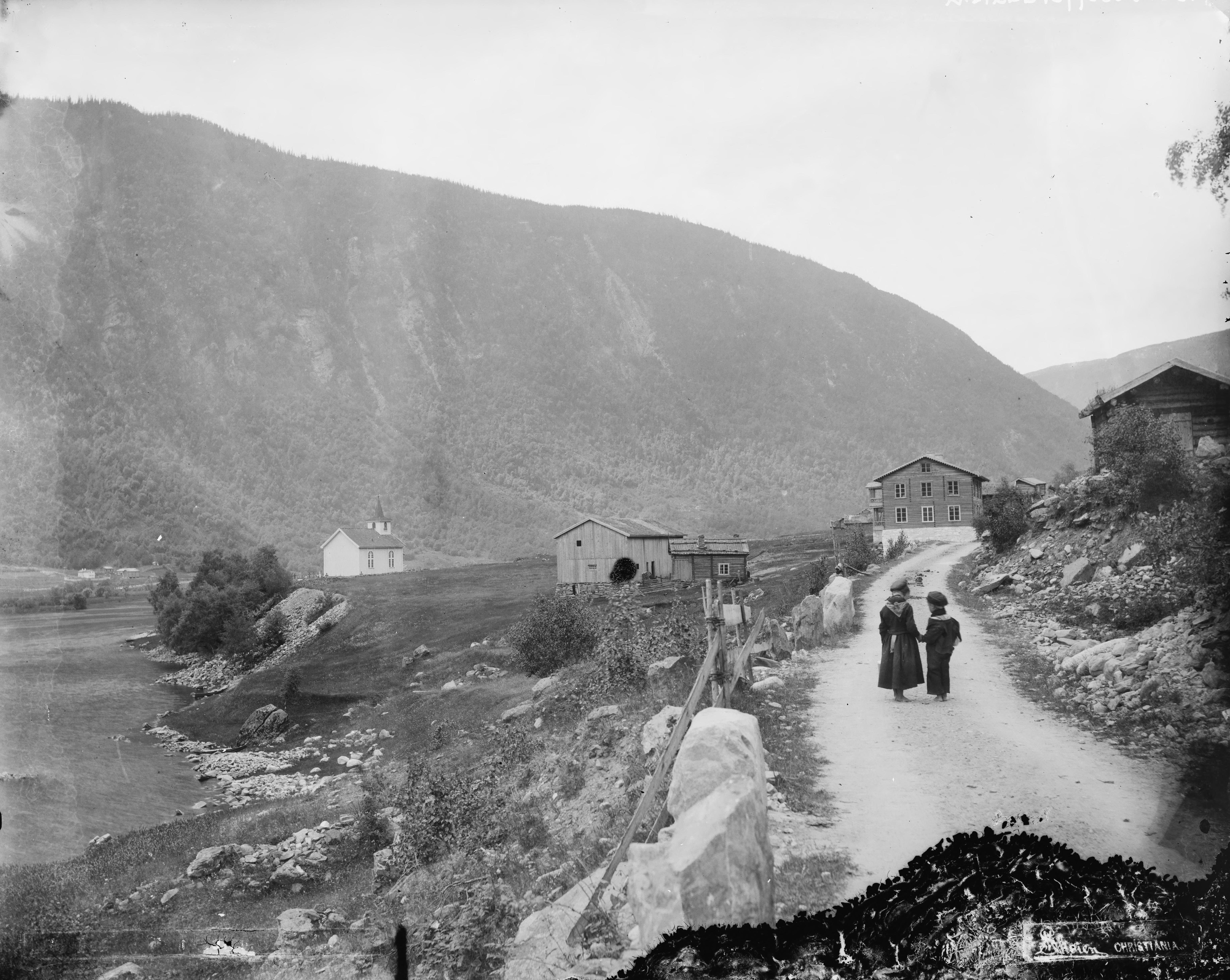
View c. 1895

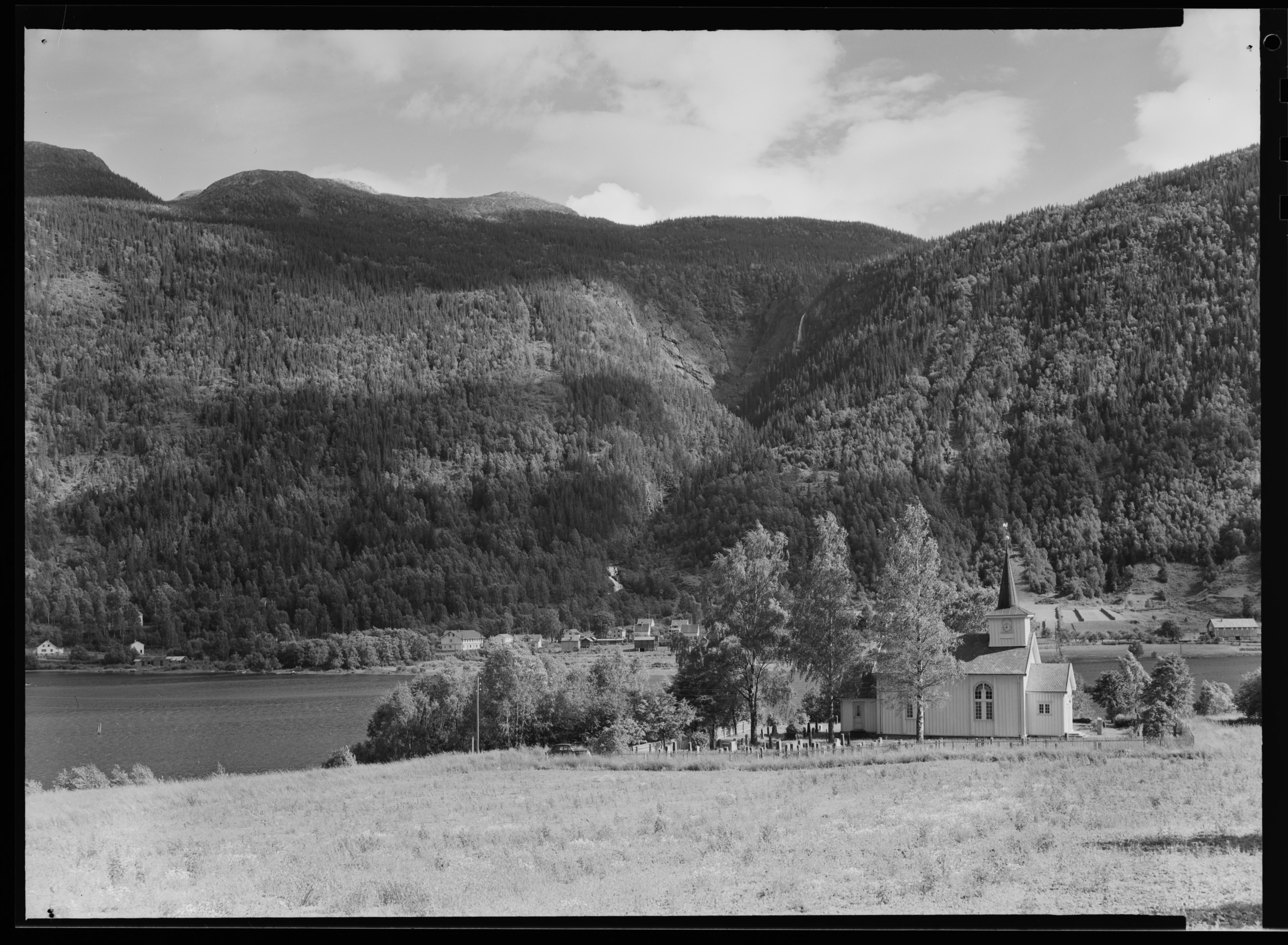
View in 1954

== See also ==
- List of churches in Agder og Telemark
