= Sam Eyde =

Norwegian engineer and businessman

Samuel Eyde
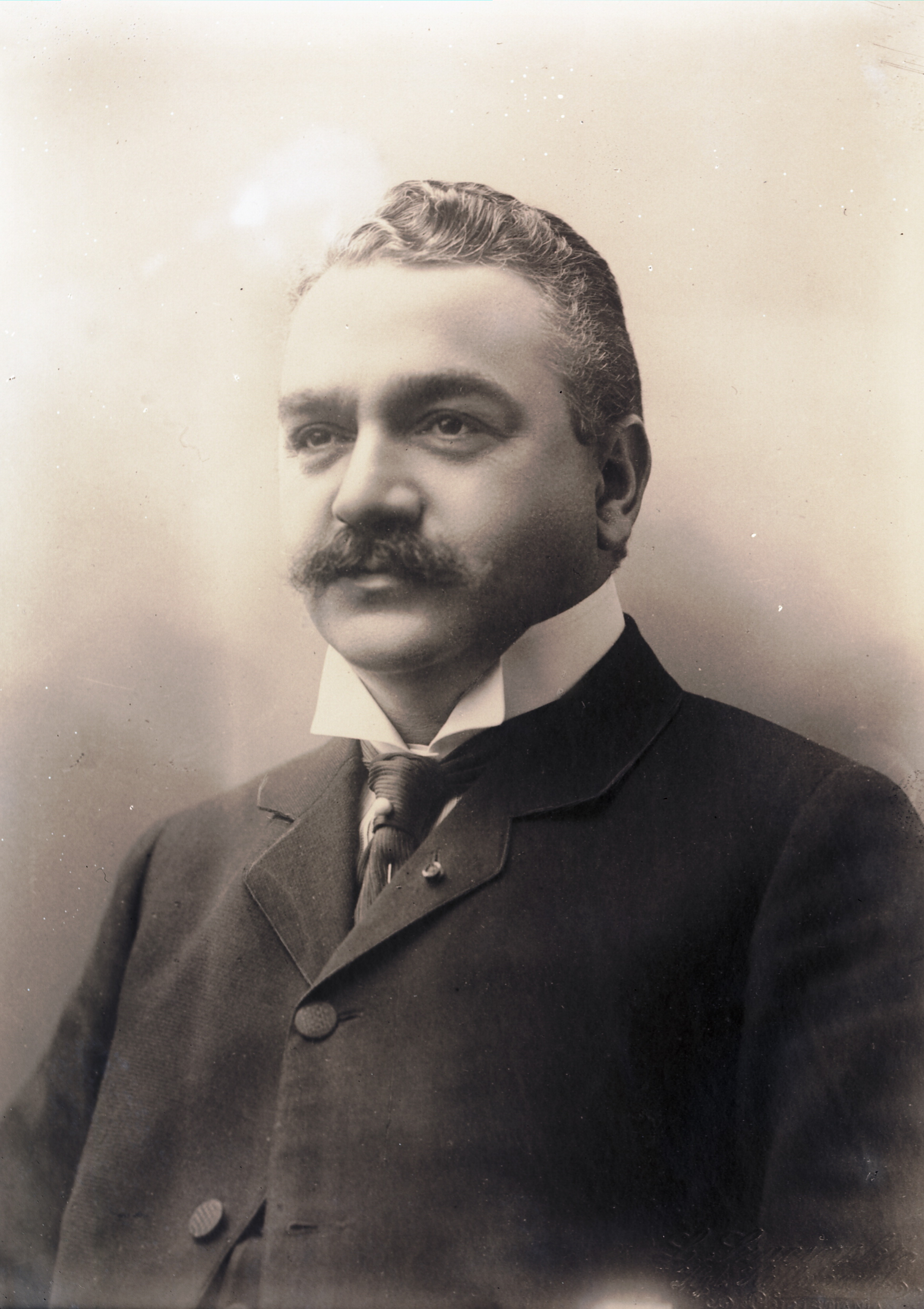
- Sam Eyde photographed in 1910
- Born: 29 October 1866; Arendal, Norway
- Died: 21 June 1940 (aged 72); Åsgårdstrand, Norway
- Known for: Birkeland–Eyde process

Samuel Eyde (29 October 1866 – 21 June 1940) was a Norwegian engineer and industrialist. He was the founder of both Norsk Hydro and Elkem.

== Personal life ==
Eyde was born in Arendal in Nedenes county, Norway. He was a son of ship-owner Samuel Eyde (1819–1902) and his wife Elina Christine Amalie Stephansen (1829–1906). He was a first cousin of Alf Scott-Hansen on the maternal side.

In August 1895 he married Countess Ulla Mörner (1873–1961), but the marriage was dissolved in 1912. In February 1913 he married actress Elly Simonsen (1885–1960).

== Career ==
Eyde studied engineering in Berlin where he graduated in 1891. He started his career in Hamburg, working with the railways where he planned new lines, bridges and stations. In 1897 he started the engineering firm Gleim & Eyde with his previous boss from Hamburg. He soon established offices in Kristiania (now Oslo) and Stockholm. By the turn of the century the firm was one of the largest in Scandinavia, with some 30 engineers.

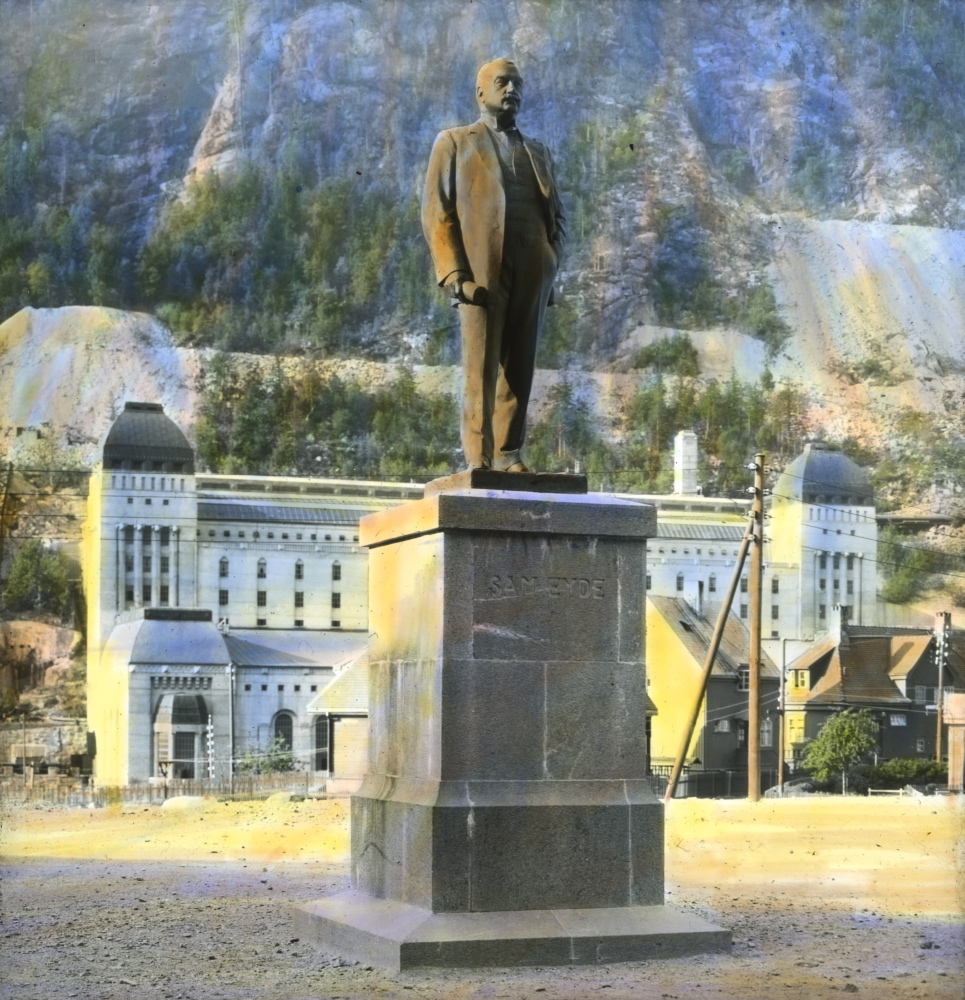
Statue of Sam Eyde at Rjukan by Gunnar Utsond unveiled in 1920

In 1902, Eyde acquired control over Rjukan Falls in Telemark. He also held rights to waterfalls at Arendal and Notodden. Eyde planned to use the hydropower for industrial purposes. In 1905 Rjukan Falls was producing hydro electrical power for Potassium nitrate production. This led to the development of the town of Rjukan as an industrial centre. In 1912 Eyde contributed to the development of Arendal Smelteverk at Eydehavn for the production of silicon carbide. The plant is now part of the Norwegian company Fiven ASA and one of the oldest silicon carbide producing plants worldwide.

In 1903, Eyde met with Kristian Birkeland, who was a scientist, inventor and professor of physics at the University of Christiania. Birkeland was working on developing an electric arc, while Eyde had recently bought the rights to several waterfalls in Telemark. They agreed to cooperate to develop an electric flame. This allowed Eyde to establish Det Norske Aktieselskap for Eletrokemisk Industri (today Elkem) along with members of the Wallenberg family who he had met in Sweden. The factory at Notodden opening on 2 May 1905.

In 1905 he founded Norsk Hydro-Elektrisk Kvælstofaktieselskab (now Norsk Hydro). Eyde remained director-general of both companies. He was director-general of Norsk Hydro until 1917. He was offered a position on the board, where he remained until 1925, and a compensation of 250,000 kr for ten years, and 100,000 kr for the rest of his life.

He was a member of the Norwegian Parliament in the period 1918–1920. In 1920, Eyde was appointed as Norwegian Minister to the United States.

== Gallery ==
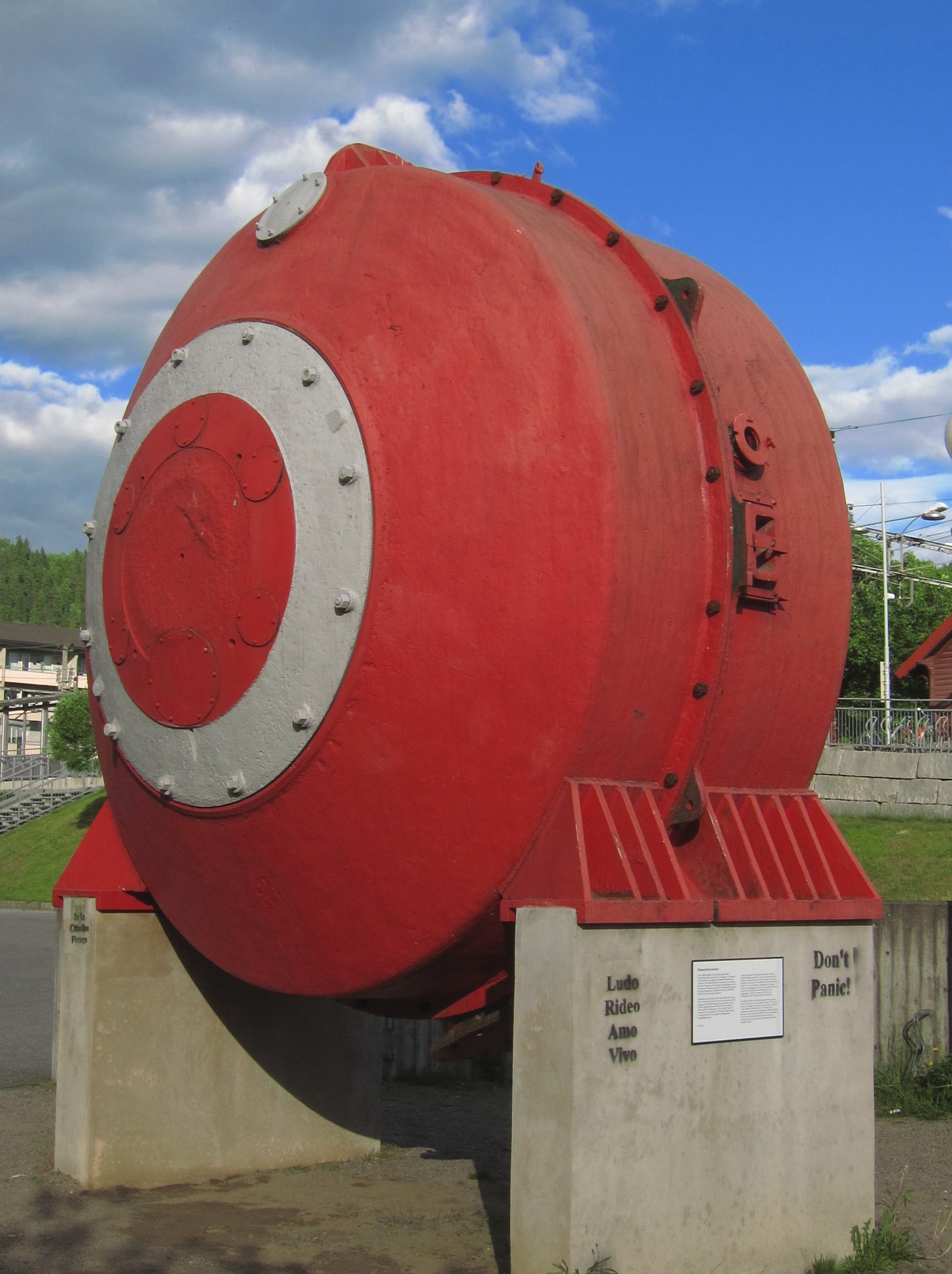
Birkeland–Eyde arc furnace displayed at Kjelsås

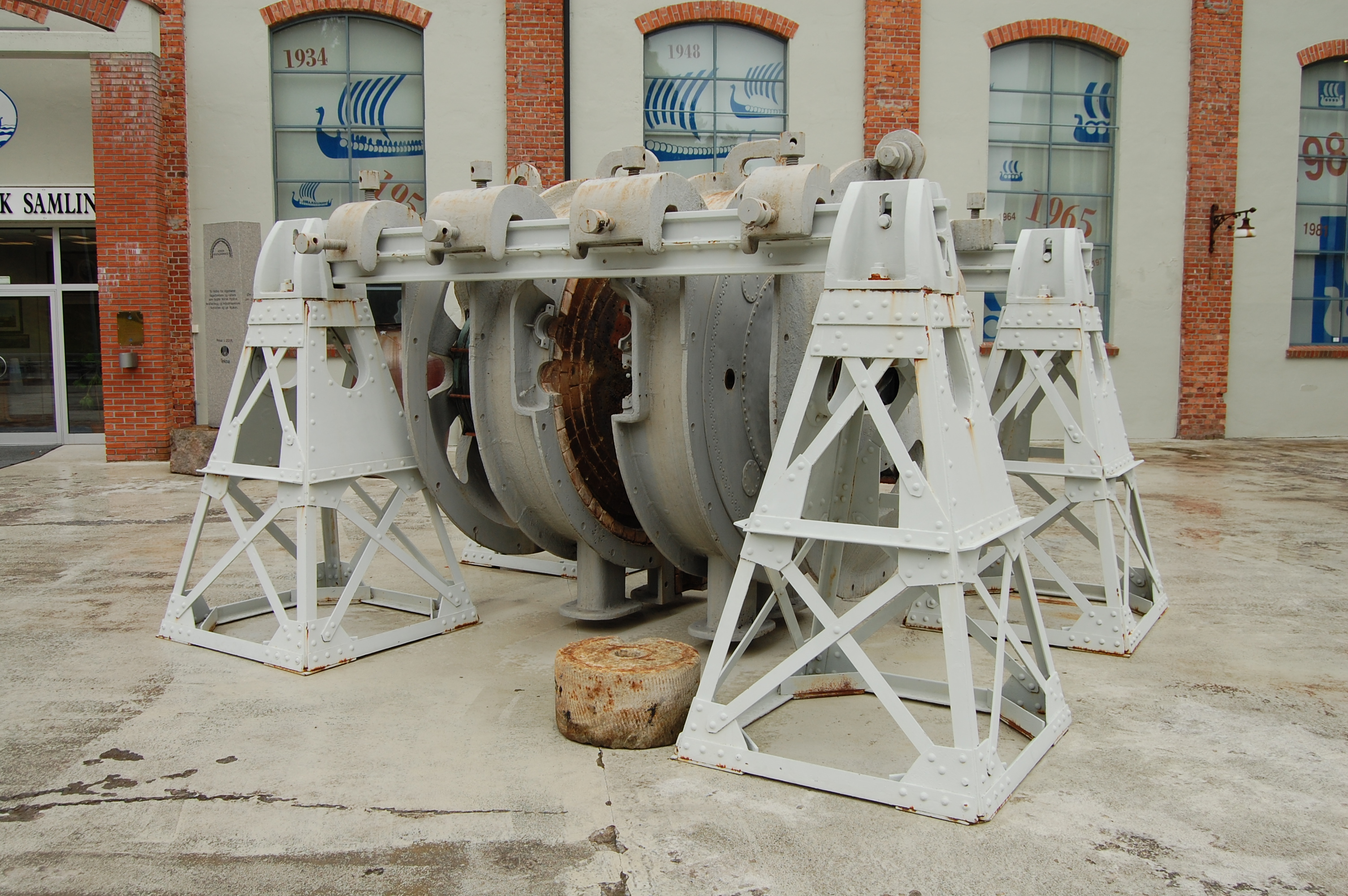
Birkeland–Eyde furnace exhibited in Notodden

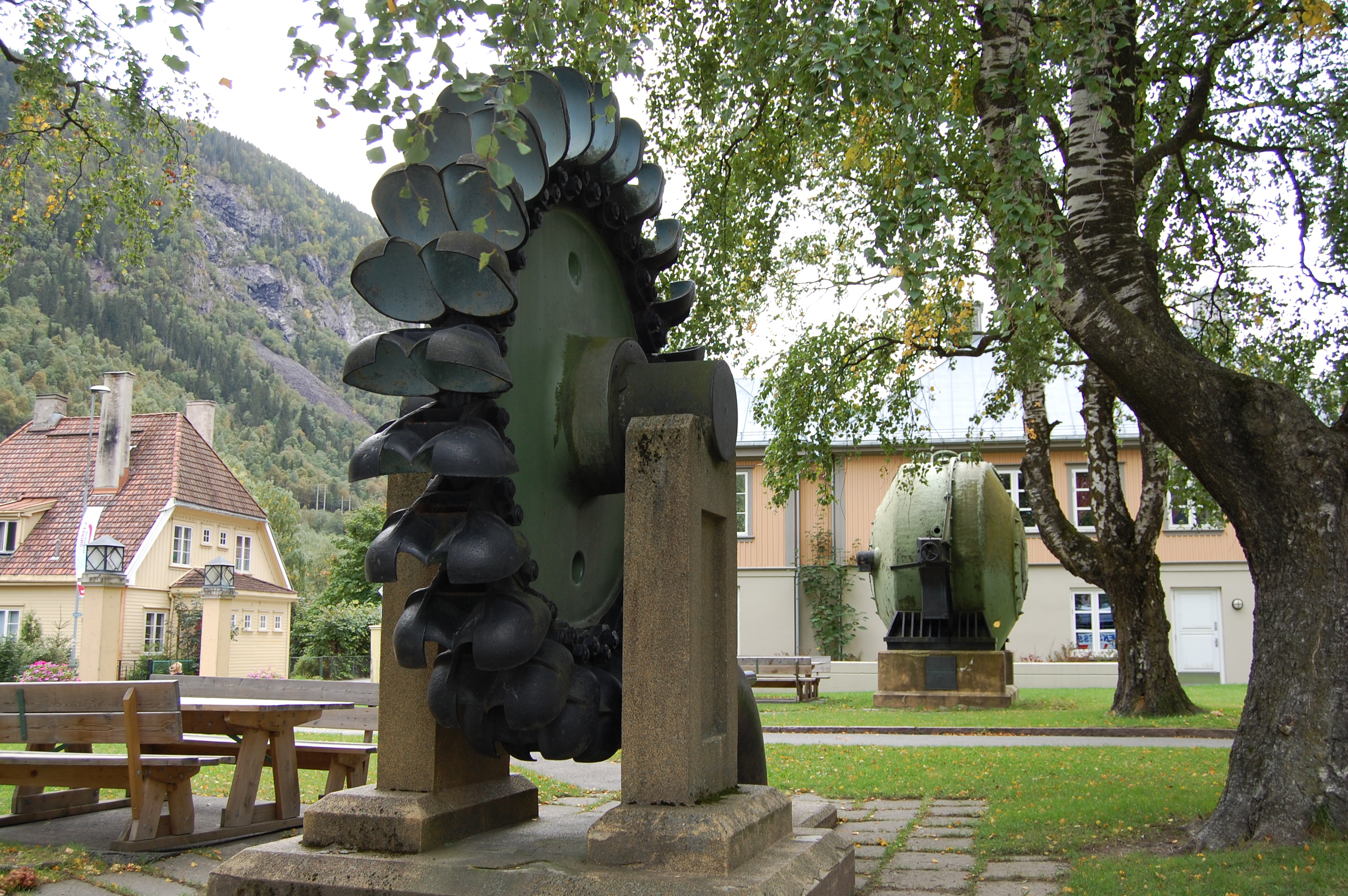
Pelton turbine runner and nozzle of a Birkeland–Eyde electric arc furnace exhibited in Rjukan

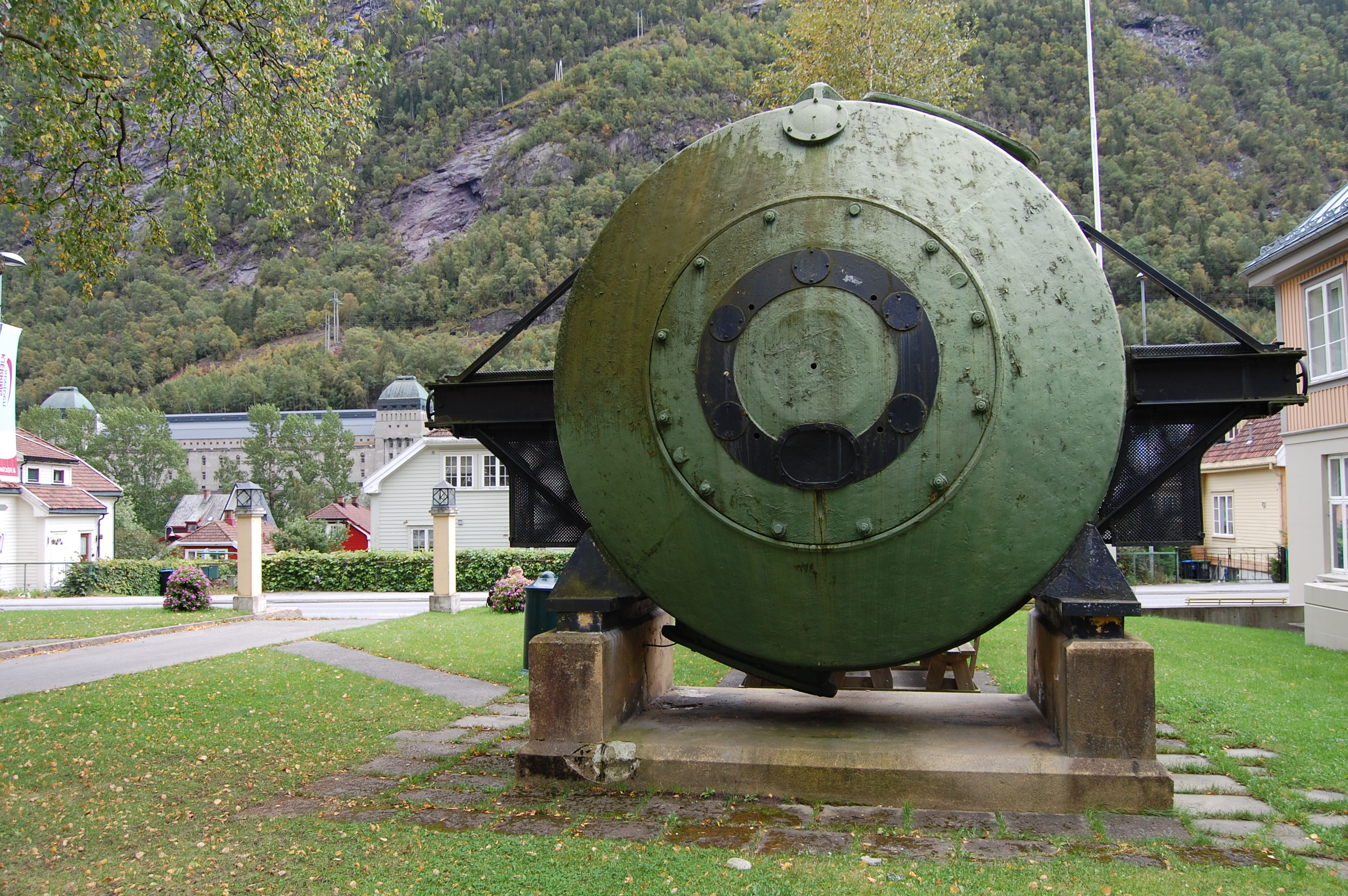
Birkeland–Eyde electric arc furnace exhibited in a park in Rjukan

== See also ==
- Birkeland–Eyde process

== Other sources ==
- Grimnes, Ole Kristian (2001) Sam Eyde: den grenseløse gründer (Oslo: Aschehoug) ISBN 82-03-22644-2

Business positions
Preceded by position created	Director-general of Norsk Hydro; 1905–1917	Succeeded by Harald Bjerke
