= Vestfjorddalen =

Valley in Telemark, Norway

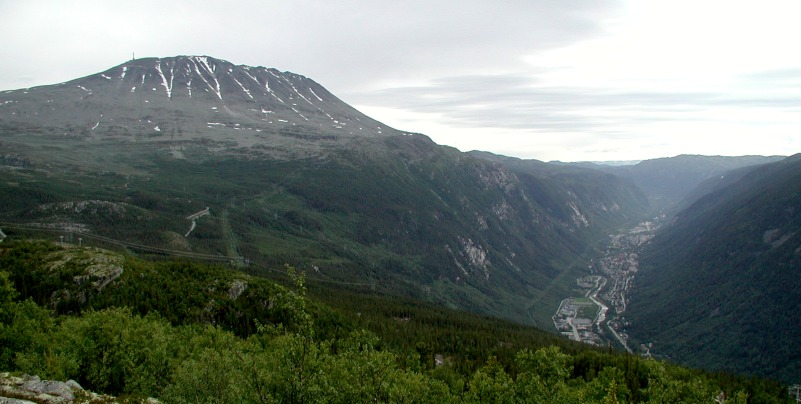
- View looking eastwards down to Rjukan
- Length: 30 kilometres (19 mi) E-W
- Width: 1 kilometre (0.62 mi)

Geology
- Type: River valley

Geography
- Location: Telemark, Norway
- Population centers: Rjukan, Miland
- Coordinates: 59.8992°N 8.7197°E
- River: Måna

Location
- Interactive map of Vestfjorddalen

Vestfjorddalen is a valley in Tinn Municipality in Telemark county, Norway. The 30-kilometre (19 mi) long valley stretches from the lake Tinnsjå westwards past Rjukan, Vemork, and Rjukan Falls to the lake Møsvatn in the west. The Måna River runs through the entire valley. The west end of the valley begins at the lake Møsvatn where the valley is quite wide. The river Måna is dammed in this area, creating the Skardfoss lake. Just below the dam lies the Rjukan Falls and the Vemork power plant. Just before the falls, the valley narrows considerably and forms a gorge. After the power plant, the valley remains very narrow, with mountains on both sides reaching 700–800 metres (2,300–2,600 ft) in height. The mountain Gaustatoppen lies along the south side of the valley. Due to the steep mountainsides along the south side of the valley, the sun is unable to reach much of the valley floor throughout the winter.
