= Svelgfoss Hydroelectric Power Station =

Hydroelectric power station in Norway

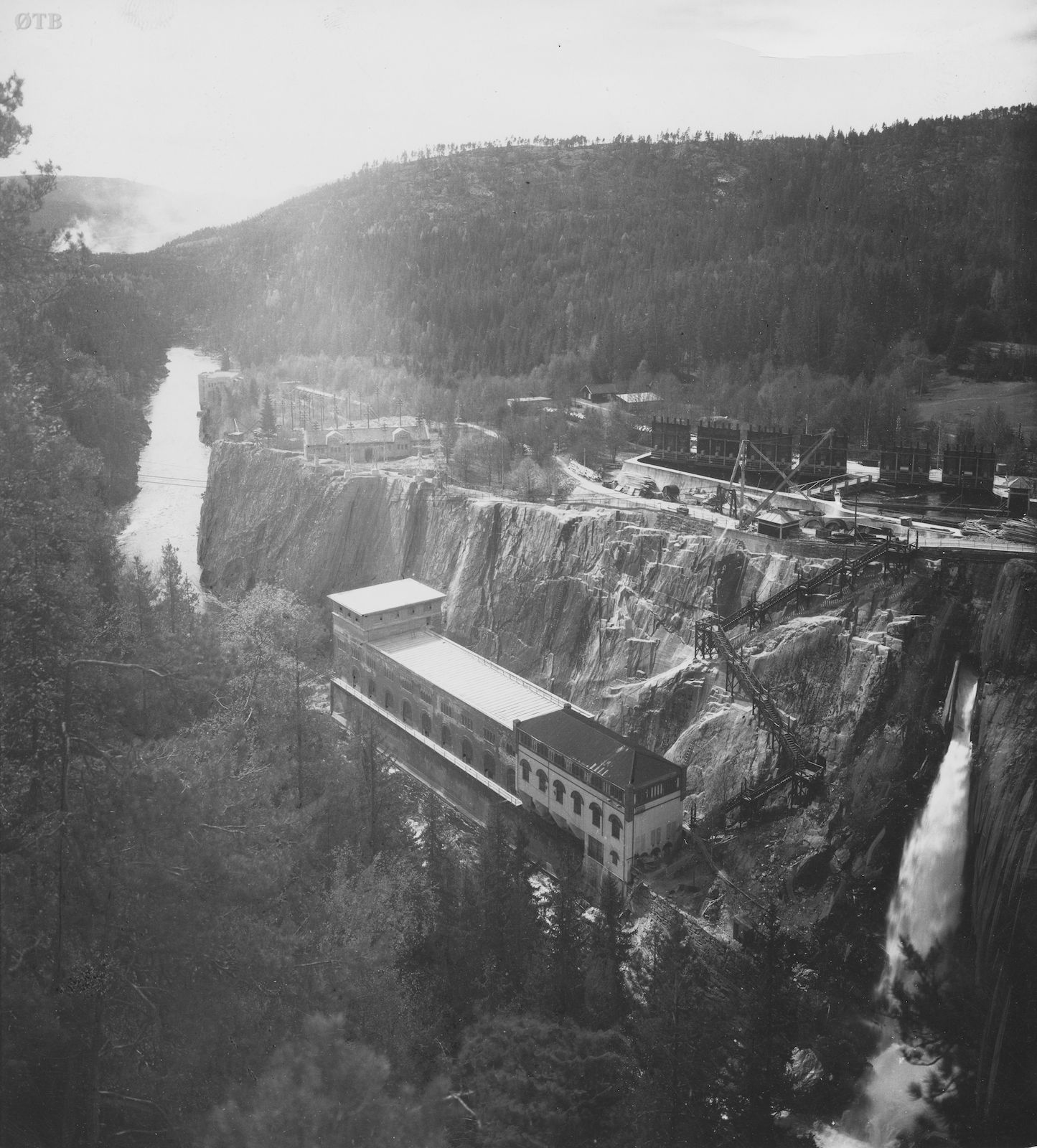
- Svælgfos I
- Interactive map of Svelgfoss Hydroelectric Power Station
- Official name: Svelgfoss kraftverk
- Country: Norway
- Location: Notodden
- Coordinates: 59°34′53″N 9°15′26″E
- Status: Operational
- Opening date: October 2, 1907; 118 years ago
- Owner: Norsk Hydro

Power Station
- Hydraulic head: 70 m (230 ft)
- Turbines: 2
- Installed capacity: 92 MW
- Capacity factor: 64.9%
- Annual generation: 523 GW·h

The Svelgfoss Power Station is a hydroelectric power station located at the Tinnelva river in Notodden, Telemark, Norway. It operates at an installed capacity of 92 megawatts (123,000 hp), with an average annual production of about 500 gigawatt-hours (1,800 TJ).

At its commissioning in 1907, the power station was the largest in Europe and the second largest at the world. It was used to provide electric power to the fertilizer plant in Notodden. In July 2015, the whole complex, the Rjukan–Notodden Industrial Heritage Site, was designated a World Heritage Site.
