= Rjukandefossen =

Waterfall in Buskerud, Norway

Coordinates: 60.8753°N 8.4642°E

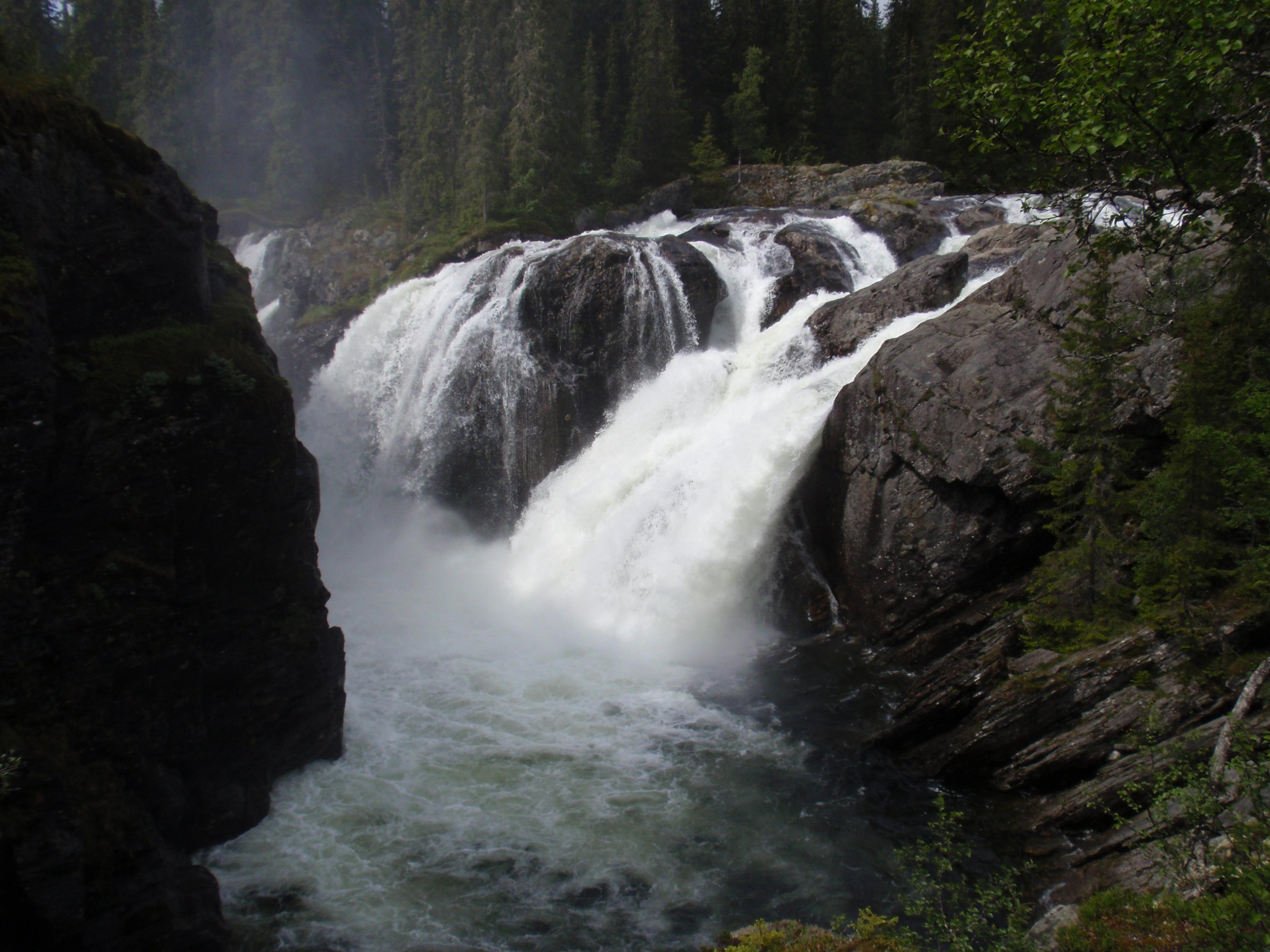
Rjukandefossen during high water level in July 2008

Rjukandefossen is a double waterfall of approximately 18 metres located in the vicinity of the village Tuv in the municipality of Hemsedal in Buskerud, Norway.

The Rjukandefoss receives water from Mørkedøla which is a catchment for much of the melting snow in the Hemsedal fell.

A suspension bridge is located about 50–100 metres after the waterfall, which can be used to cross the river.

== The name ==
Rjukan Falls

== See also ==
- List of waterfalls
