= Rjukan Falls =

- Rjukanfossen
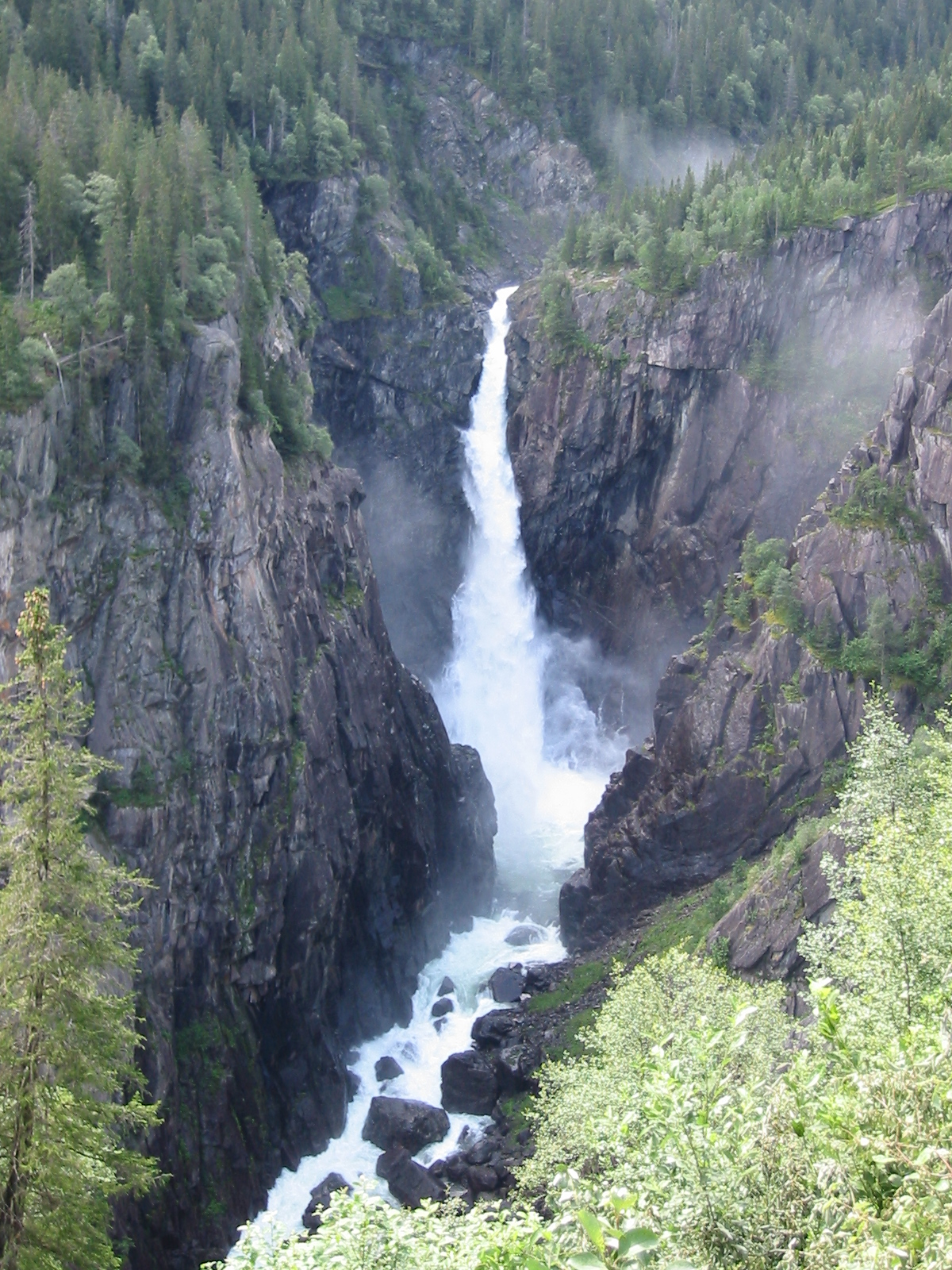
- View of the falls
- Interactive map of Rjukan Falls
- Location: Telemark, Norway
- Coordinates: 59.866257°N 8.4789004°E
- Type: Plunge
- Number of drops: 1
- Longest drop: 104 metres (341 ft)

Rjukan Falls (English) or Rjukanfossen (Norwegian) is a waterfall in the western part of the Vestfjorddalen valley in Tinn Municipality in Telemark county, Norway. The 104-metre (341 ft) waterfall is located on the river Måna, about five kilometres (three miles) west of the town of Rjukan.

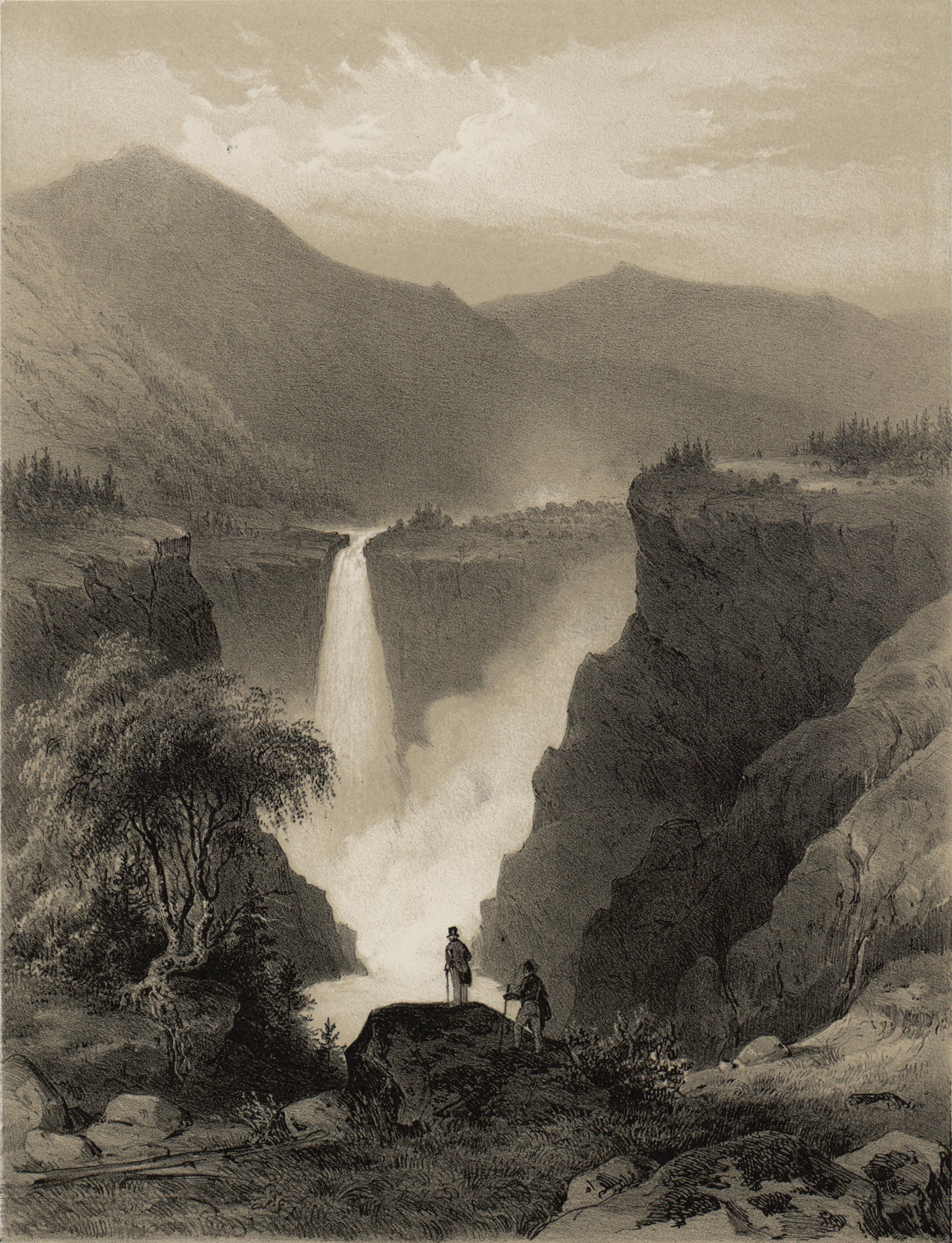
Illustration from 1848

Historically, the waterfall was a major tourist attraction, being one of the first waterfalls to be illuminated by floodlights powered by electricity generated from the waterfall itself. In 1905, the waterfall and surrounding river were harnessed by the Vemork hydro-electrical power plant to produce power for the saltpetre production at a nearby Norsk Hydro factory.

== Name ==
The waterfall is named Rjukanfossen in Norwegian (Old Norse: Rjúkandi). The first element is derived from the present participle of the verb rjúka which means "to emit smoke" or "to emit vapor" (referring to the froth produced by the waterfall).

The last element is a later addition to the name which comes from the Norwegian word fossen which means "the waterfall".

== See also ==
- List of waterfalls#Norway
- Rjukandefossen
