= Møsvatn =

Lake in Telemark, Norway

- Møsvatnet
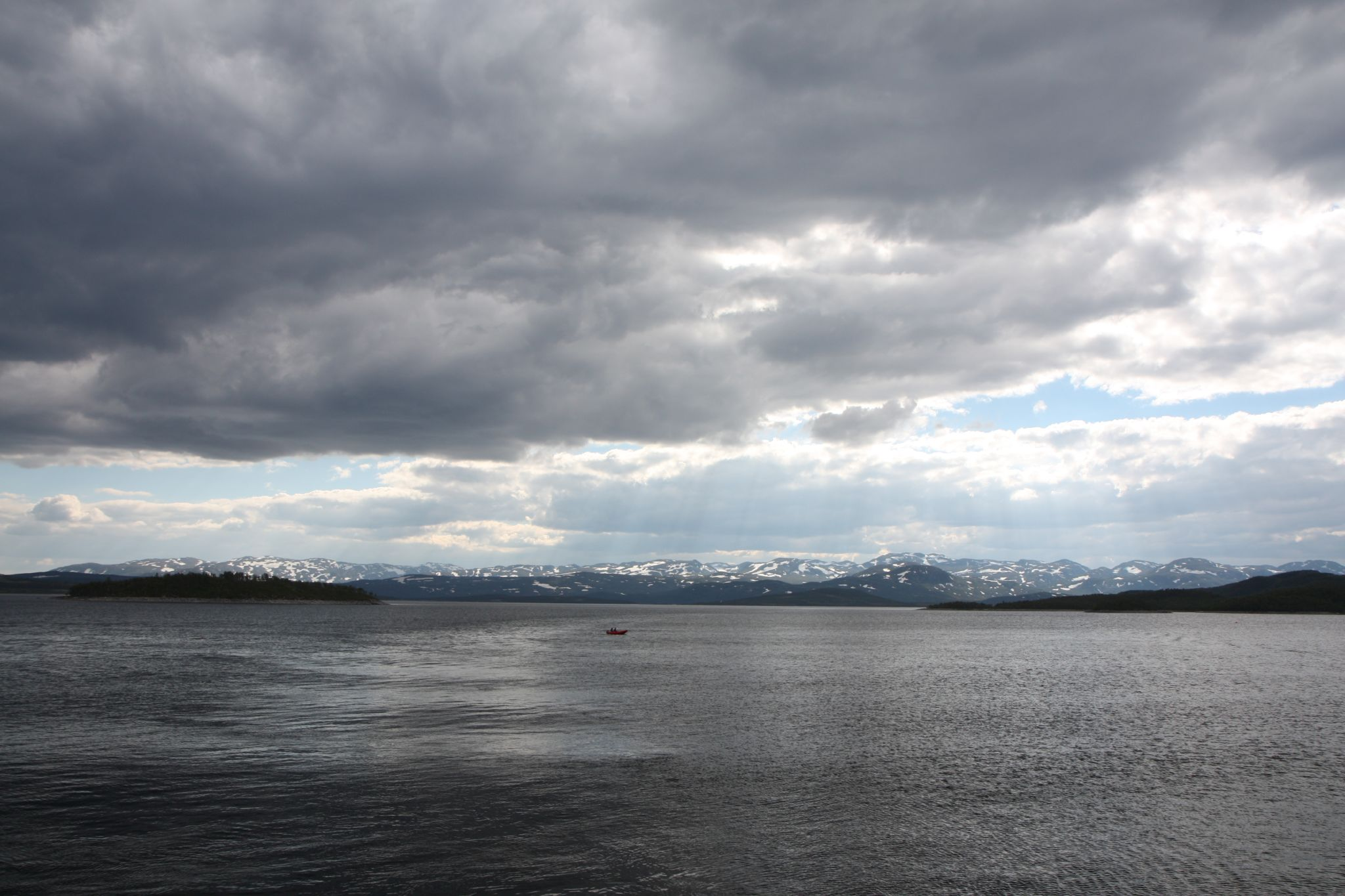
- Storfjorden on Møsvatn in direction west
- Interactive map of Møsvatn
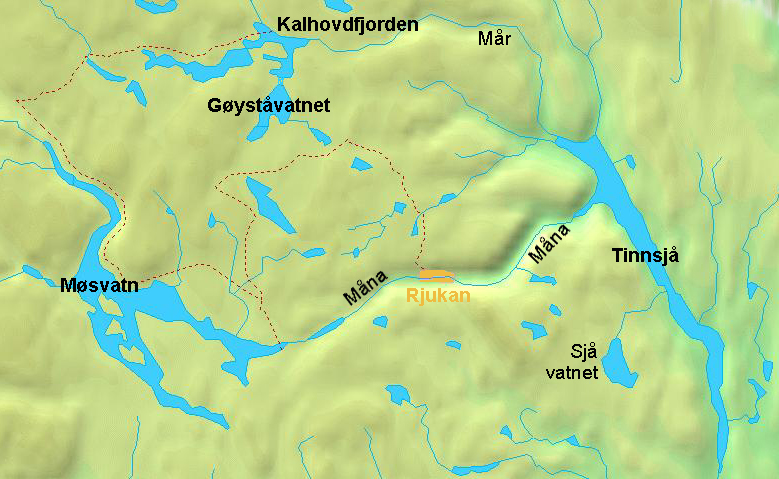
- Location: Vinje Municipality, Telemark
- Coordinates: 59.86885°N 8.02382°E
- Primary inflows: Kvenna river
- Primary outflows: Måna river
- Catchment area: 1,504 km^{2} (581 sq mi)
- Basin countries: Norway
- Max. length: 40 kilometres (25 mi)
- Max. width: 9 kilometres (5.6 mi)
- Surface area: 79.1 km^{2} (30.5 sq mi)
- Max. depth: 68.5 metres (225 ft)
- Water volume: 1,573,523,000 m^{3} (1,275,676 acre⋅ft)
- Surface elevation: 919 metres (3,015 ft)
- References: NVE

Møsvatn is a lake in Vinje Municipality in Telemark county, Norway. It is the tenth-largest lake in Norway with a surface area of 79.1 square kilometres (30.5 sq mi) and a volume of 1,573,523,000 cubic metres (1,275,676 acre⋅ft). The lake lies just east of the Hardangervidda National Park, in Skien watershed (Skiensvassdrag) catchment area. The lake discharges into the Måna river at a dam located on the Vinje-Tinn municipal border (so a very small part of the lake crosses into Tinn Municipality too). The lake has an irregular shape with three arms. The longest length across the lake is about 40 kilometres (25 mi). Møsvatn is a shallow mountain lake by Norwegian standards, reaching a maximum depth of 68.5 metres (225 ft).

From 1904 to 1906 dam was constructed and the lake was filled to begin hydroelectric power production. The lake's surface now sits at an elevation of about 919 metres (3,015 ft) above sea level with the dam on the southeast end of the lake regulating the water level. Møsvatn is Norway's fourth largest hydroelectric power reservoir with an energy content corresponding to approximately 2,300 gigawatt-hours (8,300 TJ).

== Settlements ==
There are a few islands located in the lake. The main island of Hovdeøyi is the location of the village of Møsstrond where Møsstrond Church is located. There are several small, isolated farm communities located along the borders of the lake, most of which do not have road connections, so the main mode of transportation is by boat. Some of Norway's highest mountain farms can be found around the lake. The museum and visitor's centre Hardangervidda Natursenter is located close to the lake. Boat trips on the M/B Fjellvåken II can be taken from Skinnarbu to Mogen along the border with Hardangervidda. Along the shores of the lake, many traces of Stone Age settlers can be found.

== History ==
On 19 November 1942, as part of the efforts to sabotage German heavy water production, glider-borne troops were to land on the frozen lake Møsvatn near the Vemork hydroelectric plant, run by Norsk Hydro, near the town of Rjukan. This effort was not successful; however ultimately the Norwegians stopped the heavy water production activities and helped limit the German nuclear weapons research program.

== See also ==
- List of lakes in Norway
