= Rjukan =

Town in Tinn, Norway

- Town/City
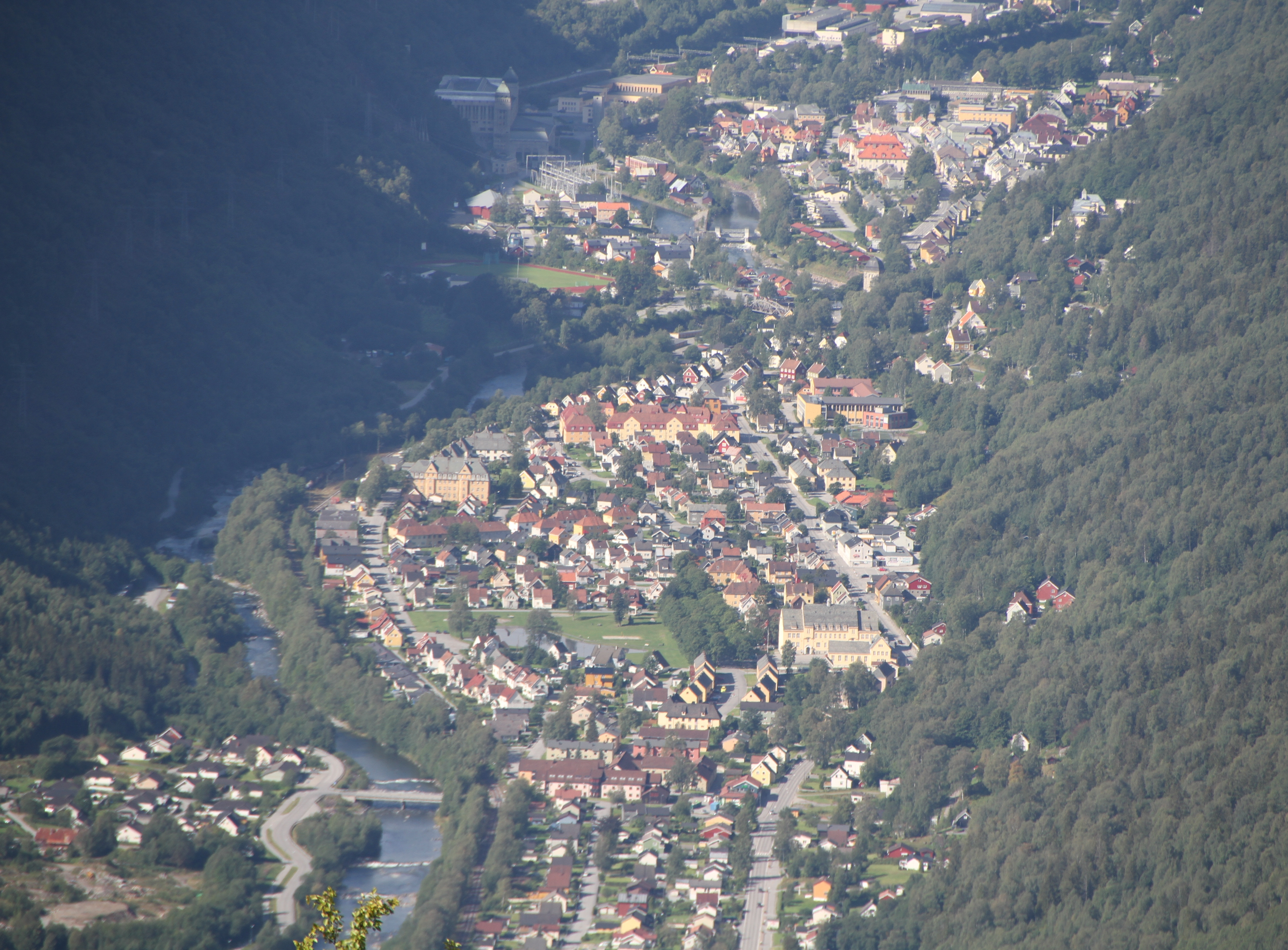
- View of the town
- Interactive map of Rjukan
- Coordinates: 59.87891°N 8.59411°E
- Country: Norway
- Region: Eastern Norway
- County: Telemark
- District: Aust-Telemark
- Municipality: Tinn Municipality
- Established as
- Town (By): 1996

Area
  - Total: 2.58 km^{2} (1.00 sq mi)
- Elevation: 300 m (980 ft)

Population (2025)
  - Total: 3,012
  - Density: 1,167/km^{2} (3,020/sq mi)
- Time zone: UTC+01:00 (CET)
  - Summer (DST): UTC+02:00 (CEST)
- Post Code: 3660 Rjukan

Rjukan (Norwegian: [ˈrʉ̀ːkɑn]) is a town in Tinn Municipality in Telemark county, Norway. The town is also the administrative centre of Tinn Municipality. The town is located in the Vestfjorddalen valley between the lakes Møsvatn and Tinnsjå. The municipal council of Tinn declared town status for Rjukan in 1996. The town is located about ten kilometres (six miles) to the west of the village of Miland and about 20 kilometres (12 mi) to the northwest of the village of Tuddal (in Hjartdal Municipality).

The 2.58-square-kilometre (640-acre) town has a population (2025) of 3,012 and a population density of 1,167 inhabitants per square kilometre (3,020/sq mi).

The town was essentially "built from scratch" due to the industrial developments by Norsk Hydro in the 1910s and 1920s. It got its name from the Rjukan Falls west of the town. At its peak, Rjukan was a significant industrial center in Telemark. It became a World Heritage Site under the name Rjukan–Notodden Industrial Heritage Site on 5 July 2015. The town is perhaps best known for the heavy water sabotage operations at the local Vemork hydroelectric power plant during World War II.

Rjukan does not get any direct sunlight between September and March because the low sun is blocked by the tall Gaustatoppen mountain located directly to the south. In 2013, at a cost of 5 million kr, an art project called the Sunmirror in Rjukan built several large mirrors on the northern mountainside above the town to reflect the Sun down into the town during these dark months. The mirrors illuminate a small portion of the town square each day.

== History ==
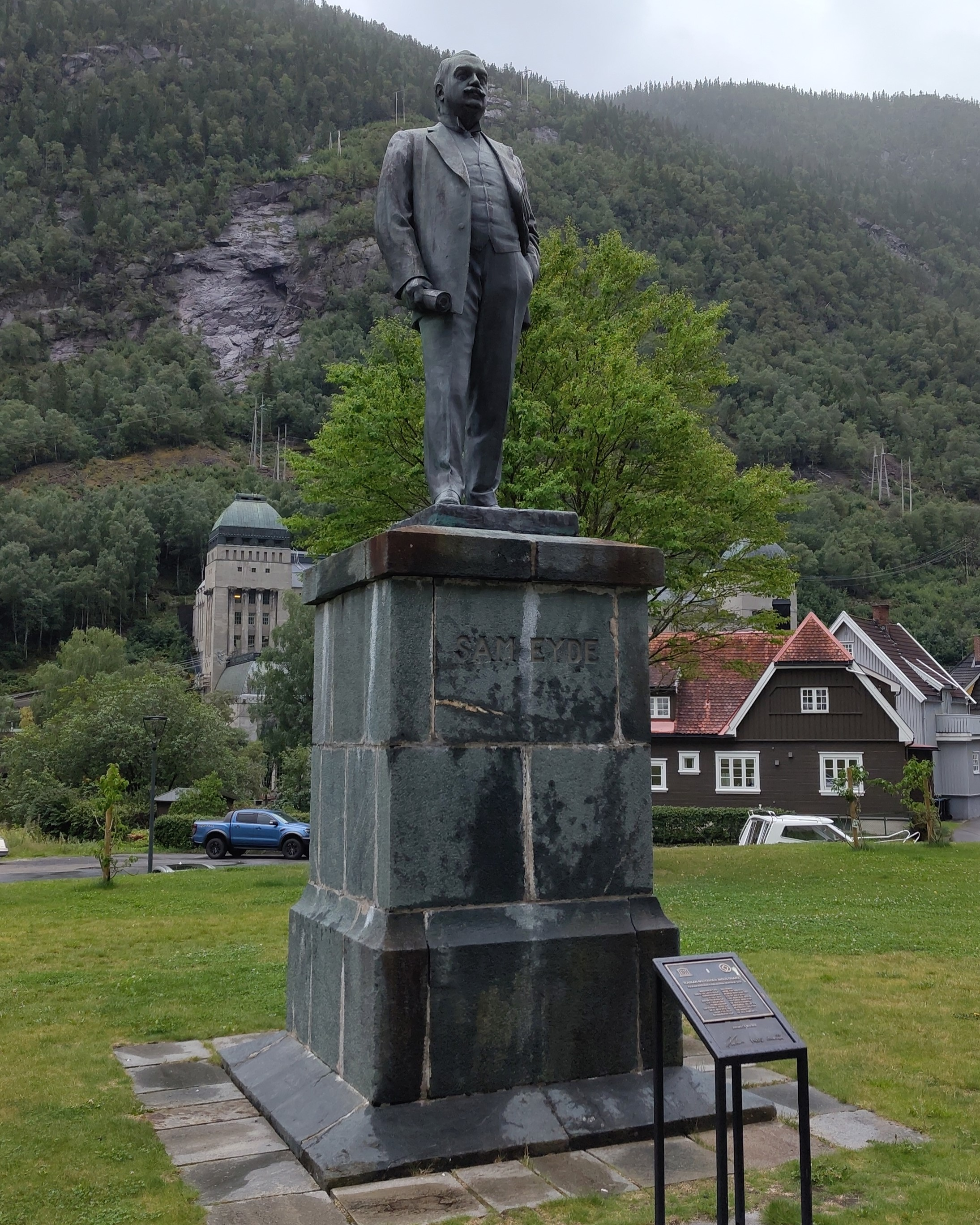
Statue of Sam Eyde, one of the founders of Norsk Hydro and Rjukan

In 1906, the area which would become Rjukan consisted of only a few farmsteads, then called Saaheim, when Norsk Hydro began planning saltpeter (fertilizer) production in the area using the newly developed Birkeland–Eyde process. Rjukan was chosen because the Rjukan Falls, with a 104-metre (341 ft) longest single fall, provided easy means of generating the large amounts of electricity that was required.

The Vemork hydroelectric power plant was built between 1907 and 1911, and was at the time the world's largest hydroelectric power plant. A similar power plant was finished in Såheim in 1915. The power plants had a combined cost of more than 200 million kr, the equivalent of two annual national budgets at the time. With the factories, many houses for the factory workers also had to be built, in addition to a train station and a town hall. The town formally changed its name to Rjukan, and in 1920 reached a population of 8,350.

In 1934, Norsk Hydro built a hydrogen plant next to the Vemork power plant. A by-product of hydrogen production via water electrolysis was heavy water. It was the later Nobel Prize winner Odd Hassel who told Norsk Hydro that they were in fact in possession of the only regular heavy water production in Europe. At the time heavy water was believed to be a necessary component of an atomic bomb. When Norway came under German occupation during World War II, destroying this production became an important priority to the Allies. The facilities were sabotaged twice by the Norwegian resistance movement and bombed by allied forces.

After 1960, most of Norsk Hydro's saltpeter production in Rjukan was transferred to factories at Herøya in Porsgrunn.

== Government ==
In Norway, municipalities are the unit of local government. This means that cities and towns are simply designations for urban areas, but under current Norwegian law, they have no actual government authority. The town of Rjukan lies within Tinn Municipality and is therefore governed by the municipal council of Tinn Municipality.

== Tourism ==
Rjukan has a long history of tourism, beginning in the 19th century, then mostly focused on the Rjukan Falls. Later, the local resistance fighter and mountain guide Claus Helberg called Rjukan "the cradle of tourism in Norway."

In 1811, royal geologist Jens Esmark "discovered" the Rjukan Falls, and enthusiastically reported to the Dano–Norwegian King Frederik VI that he had found "the tallest of all known waterfalls, not just in Europe, but the whole world", which was completely wrong. Apparently, his assistant wrongly measured the total fall at 271 metres (889 ft) tall. In reality, it has a total fall of 238 metres (781 ft), with a largest single fall of 104 metres (341 ft). Skorga, the tallest waterfall in Norway and the sixth tallest in the world, has a total fall of 875 metres (2,871 ft).

Nonetheless, the valley became a famous tourist sight for the European upper classes. During the 19th century, two inns served Norwegian and international guests. One of these guests was French author Jules Verne, who stayed in Rjukan in 1861 during his travels through Norway. During this time he wrote The Lottery Ticket, an adventure novel set in Telemark. In the novel, he describes the Rjukan Falls as "one of the most spectacular waterfalls in Europe."

In addition to the waterfall, Rjukan had good terrain for skiing, and was a good starting point for hiking on the Hardangervidda plateau and Gaustatoppen.

In 1968, Krokan by the Rjukan waterfall became the Norwegian Trekking Association's (DNT) first cabin. After the waterfall was harnessed for hydropower production, the hut was sold. Today it is re-opened and a part of the UNESCO World Heritage site, situated by the main road from Rjukan to Vinje Municipality.

Today, tourism to Rjukan is focused on hiking opportunities, the local Gaustablikk ski resort (one of the largest in Norway), and the Norwegian Industrial Workers Museum at Vemork. It is also considered one of the best ice climbing areas in Northern Europe because of the large number of waterfalls, and because the lack of sun gives ice consistently.

=== Rjukan Church ===
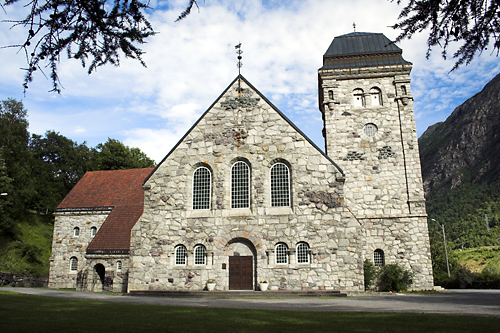
Rjukan Church

Rjukan Church was constructed of natural stone with a tower at the entrance to the southwest. The church was consecrated on 21 December 1915. The church was designed by the architects Carl and Jørgen Berner with a cruciform architectural floorplan. The altar image came into place in April 1917 and was painted by Bernhard Folkestad. Seven vaulted windows in the foundation wall have stained glass paintings by Torvald Moseid. In February 1965, while filming Heroes of Telemark, the gallery caught fire, and all combustible material in the church burnt down; only the walls remained. Asbjørn Stein was commissioned as the architect for the reconstruction. The tower was severely heat damaged and had to be largely rebuilt. Most of the walls were reused, and the church basically got the same exterior, but the interior was quite different. The church was ready in 1968 (consecrated on 28 April).

== Gallery ==
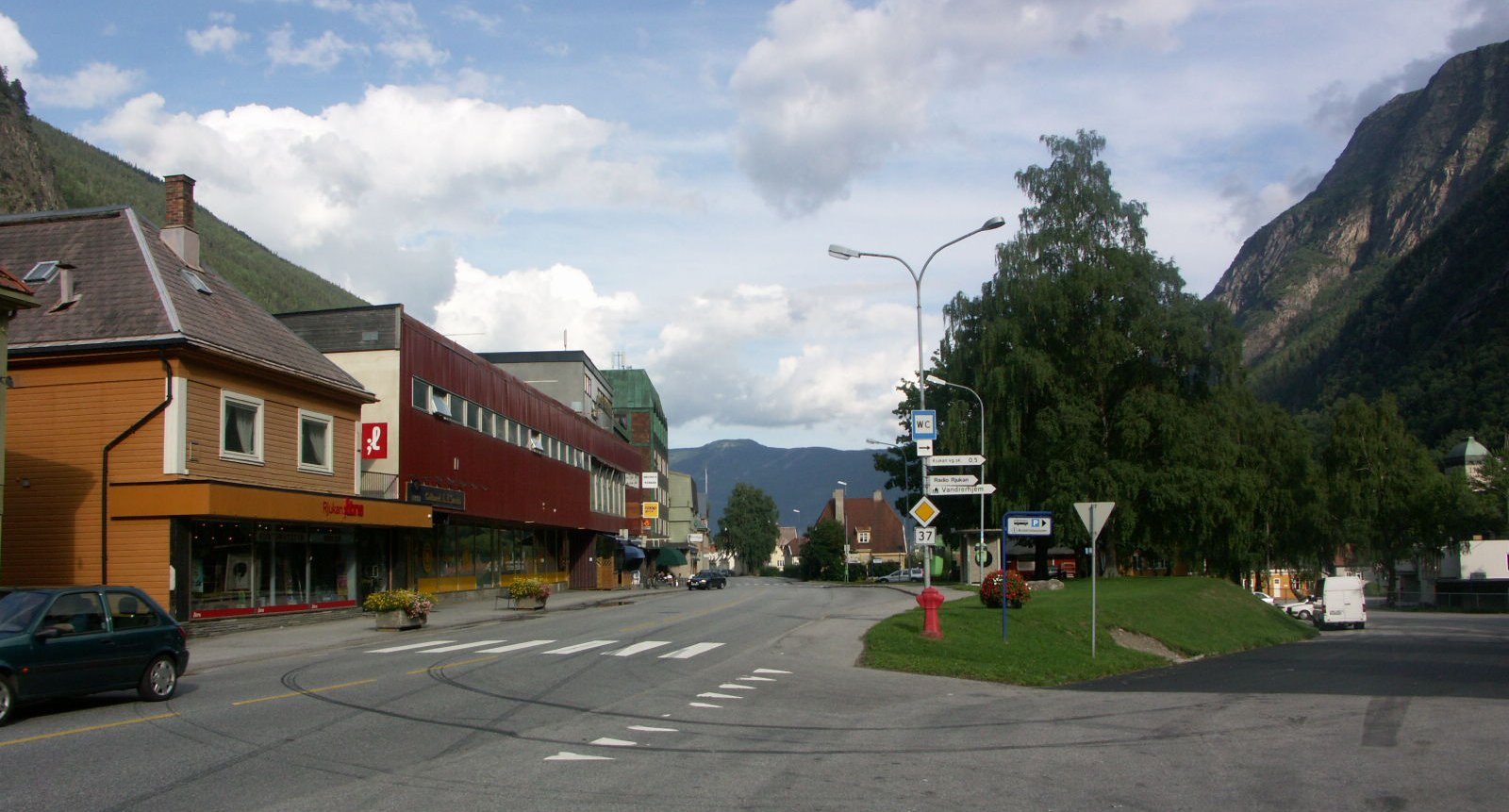
Rjukan town center, narrowly sandwiched between tall, steep slopes

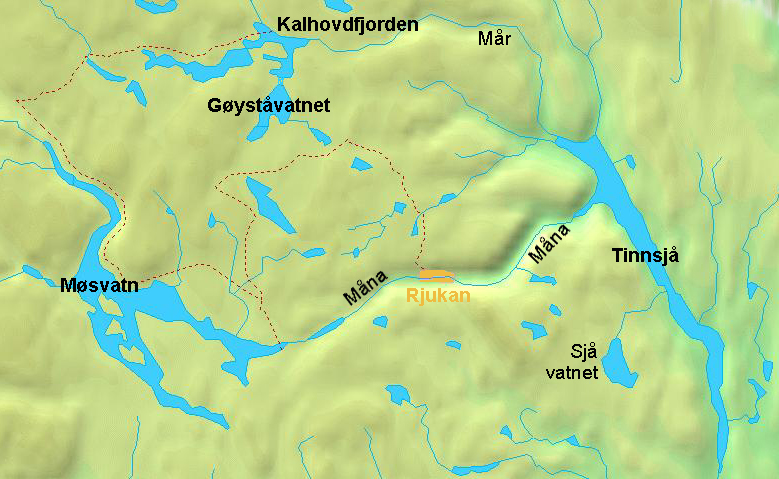
Map showing the position of Rjukan between lakes Møsvatn (west, upstream) and Lake Tinn (east)

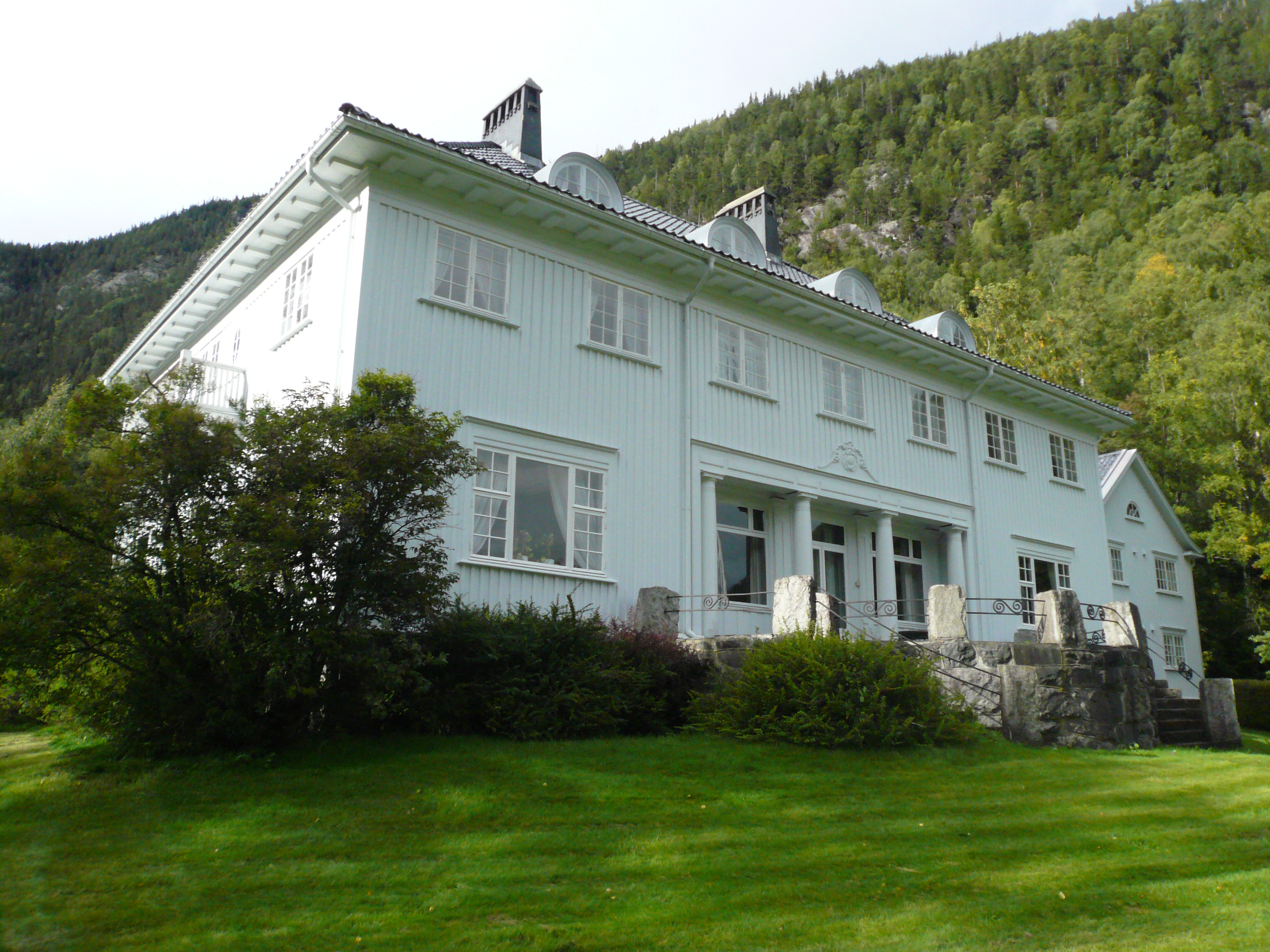
Norsk Hydro Administration Building

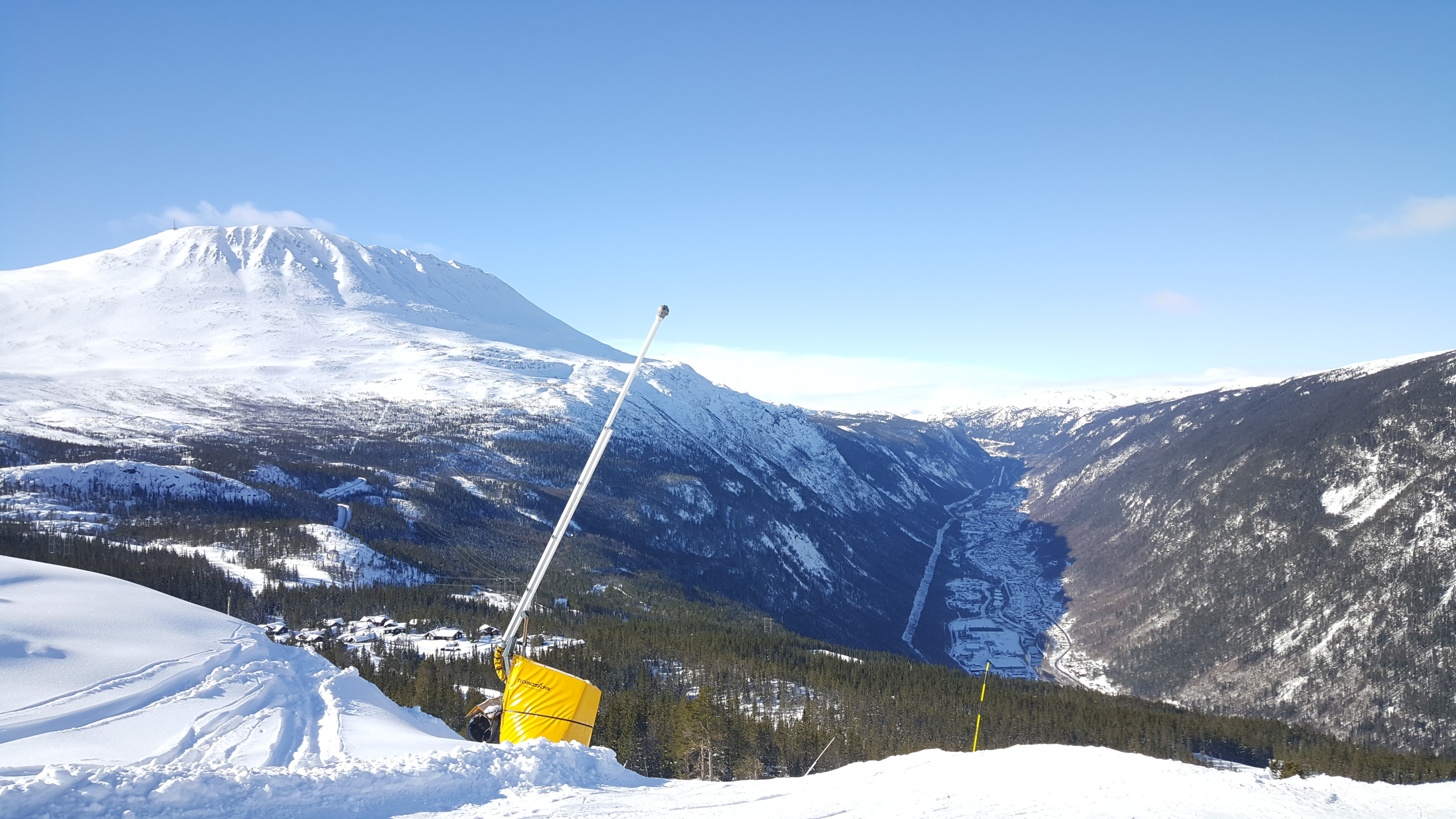
Rjukan is in constant shadow during the winter. Image taken from Gausta ski center.

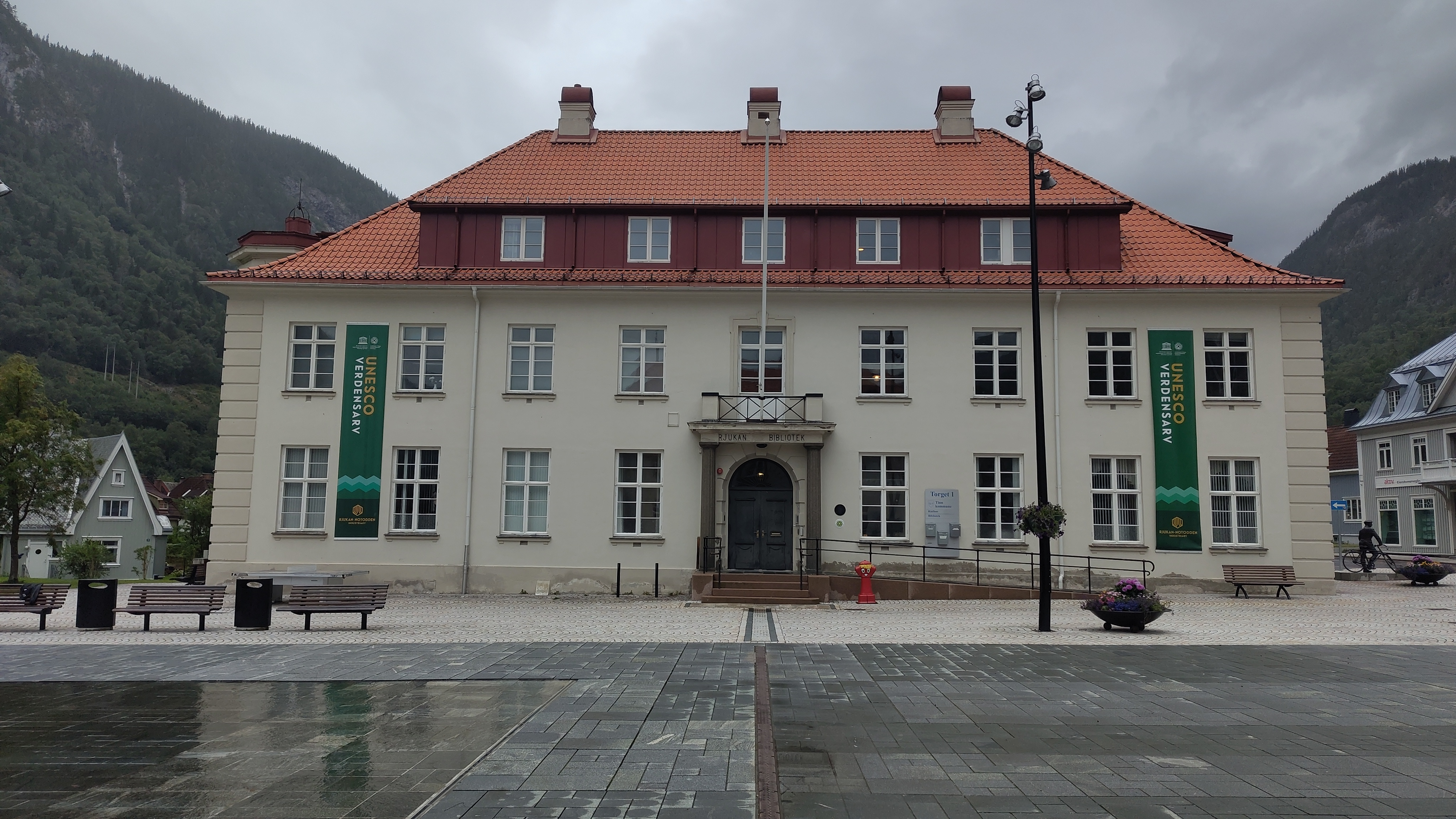
Tinn library and town hall

== See also ==
- List of towns and cities in Norway
- Norwegian heavy water sabotage
- Norsk Hydro Rjukan
- Rjukan–Notodden Industrial Heritage Site
