= Såheim Hydroelectric Power Station =

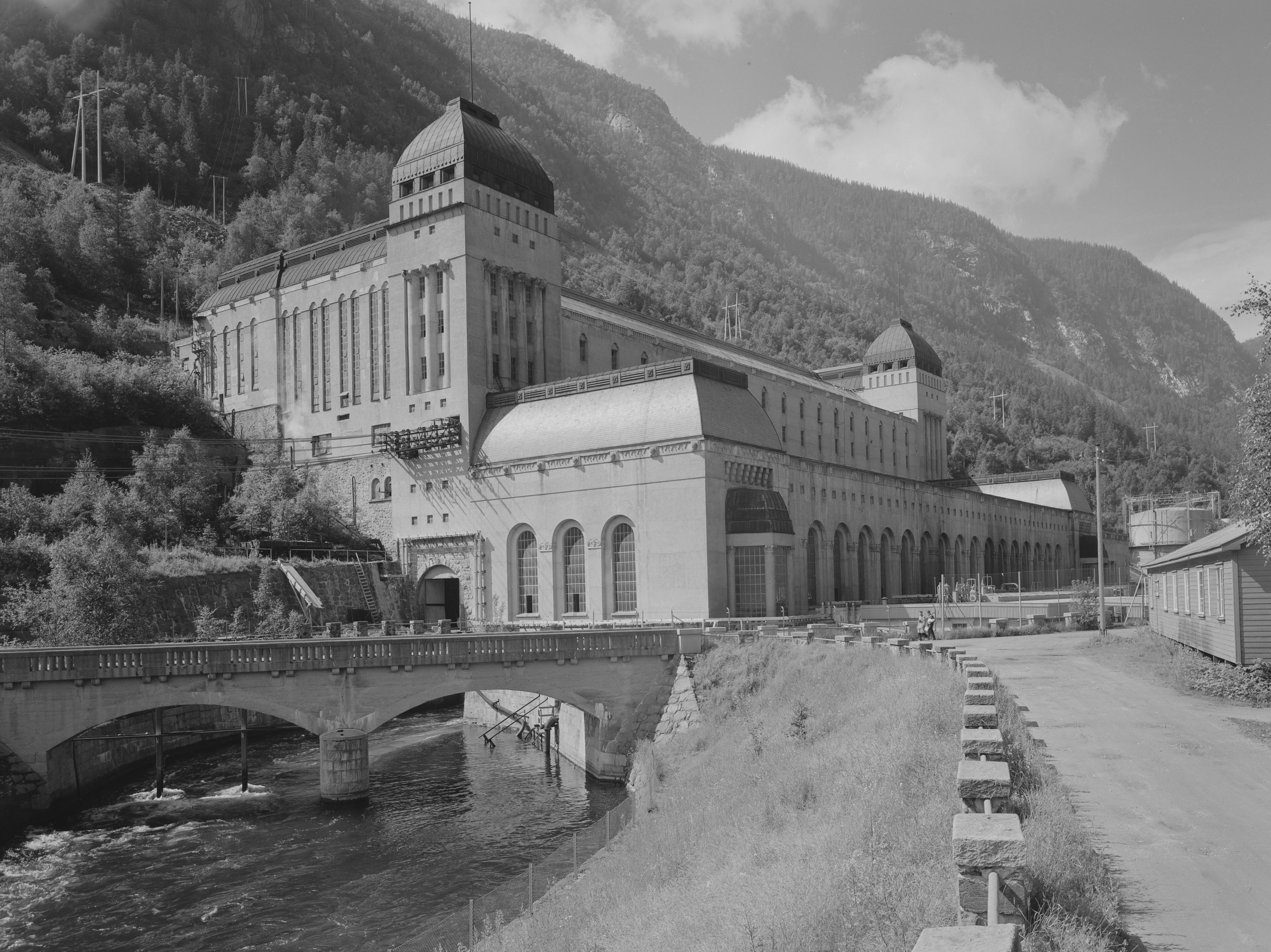
- Såheim Power Station in 1954
- Official name: Såheim kraftverk
- Country: Norway
- Location: Rjukan
- Coordinates: 59°52′37″N 8°35′34″E
- Status: Operational
- Construction began: 1914
- Opening date: January 1916; 109 years ago
- Owner(s): Norsk Hydro

Power Station
- Hydraulic head: 269 m
- Turbines: 3
- Installed capacity: 185 MW
- Capacity factor: 63.8%
- Annual generation: 1,033 GW·h

The Såheim Power Station is a hydroelectric power station located in Rjukan, Telemark, Norway, operated by Norsk Hydro. It operates at an installed capacity of 185 MW, with an average annual production of 1,033 GWh. The station building from 1915 was designed by architects Thorvald Astrup and Olaf Nordhagen.
