= RjB 9 and 10 =

Identical electric locomotives in Norway

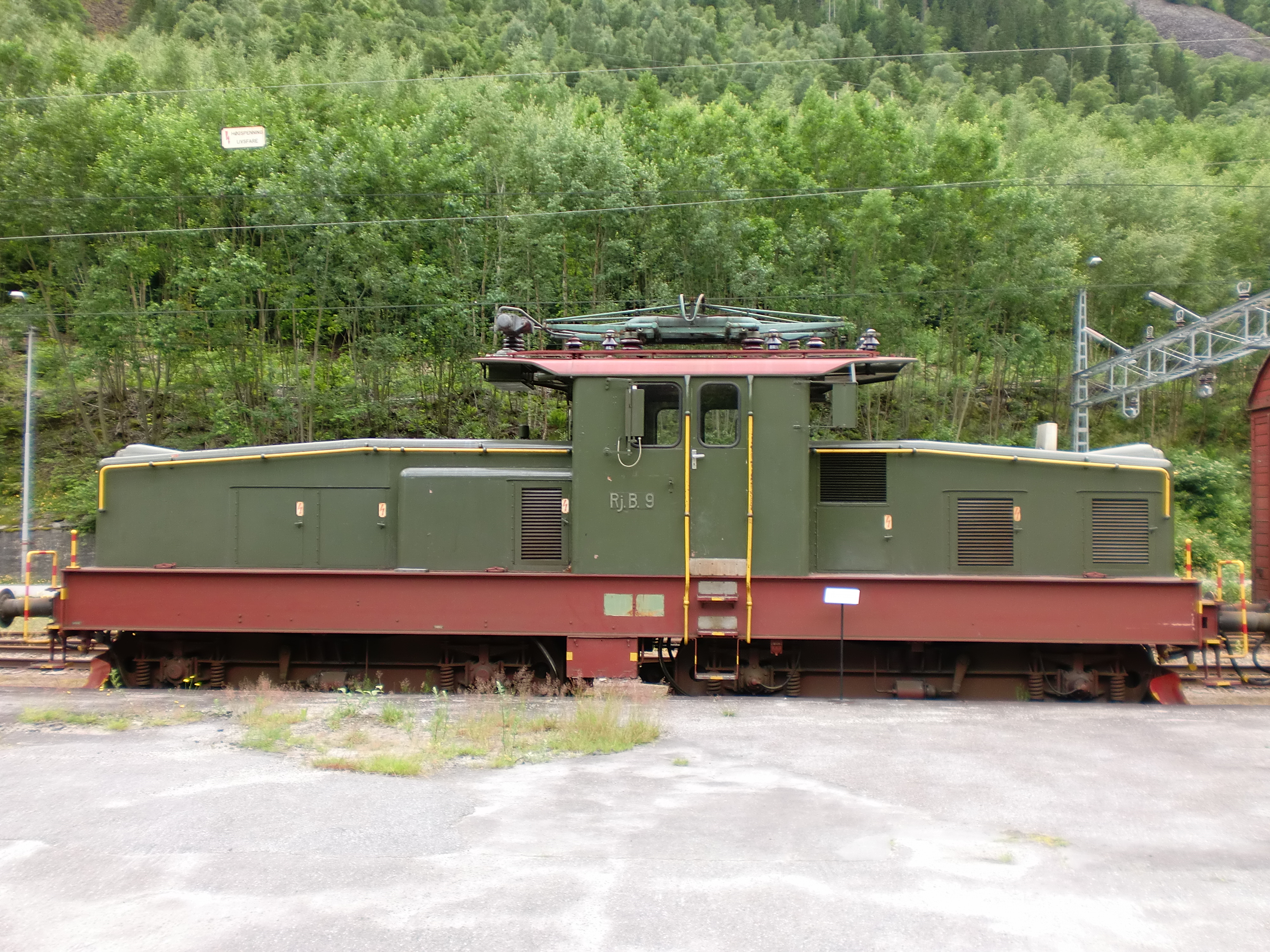
- Side view of Rj.B 9 at Rjukan station in July 2012
Type and origin
- Power type: Electric
- Builder: Sécheron (electrical); Jung (mechanical)
- Serial number: 8725; 12846–12847
- Build date: 1958
- Total produced: 2
Specifications
- Configuration
  - UIC: Bo'Bo'
- Gauge: 1,435 mm (4 ft 8 1/2 in)
- Length: 13,150 mm (43 ft 2 in)
- Loco weight: 60 t
- Electric system/s: 10 kV 16 2/3 Hz AC, 15 kV 16.7 Hz AC
- Current pickup(s): Pantograph
Performance figures
- Maximum speed: 55 km/h (34 mph)
- Power output: 732 kW (cont.) / 830 kW (1-hour)
Career
- Operators: Norsk Transport
- Official name: 9, 10

RjB 9 and RjB 10 were two identical electric locomotives operated by Norsk Transport on Rjukanbanen in Norway. Built by Swiss Sécheron and German Jung in 1958, they served until the closing of the line in 1991.

The locomotives were equipped with four 183 kW motors, giving 732 kW in total. They could operate at 55 km/h, and were built for both 10 kV and 15 kV electrical systems; the former was used on Rjukanbanen until the older RjB 1–8 were retired in 1966, and the power changed to the standard of Norges Statsbaner.

A b/w photograph of unit # 9 heading a freight working en route appeared in "Locomotives made in Germany", 1966 ed., pg.15 bottom; issued by "Exportfoerderungsverband der deutschen Lokomotivindustrie", DE-Frankfurt/Main 1966, softcover, quadrilingual. Rating given at 830 kW by the caption; factor 1,13 reflects the ratio between a 1-hourly rating and a continuous rating (as likely given in the text here) for series-wound, directly-fed, single-phase ac electric motors. Unfortunately, no further detail was issued. Mechanical design reflects that of the shorter, yet heavier dual-power Bo'Bo' 600 V DC o/h-fed electric / diesel-electric locomotives supplied by Jung to the "E&H" docklands and smelting works railways of Duisburg-Hamborn at the same time.

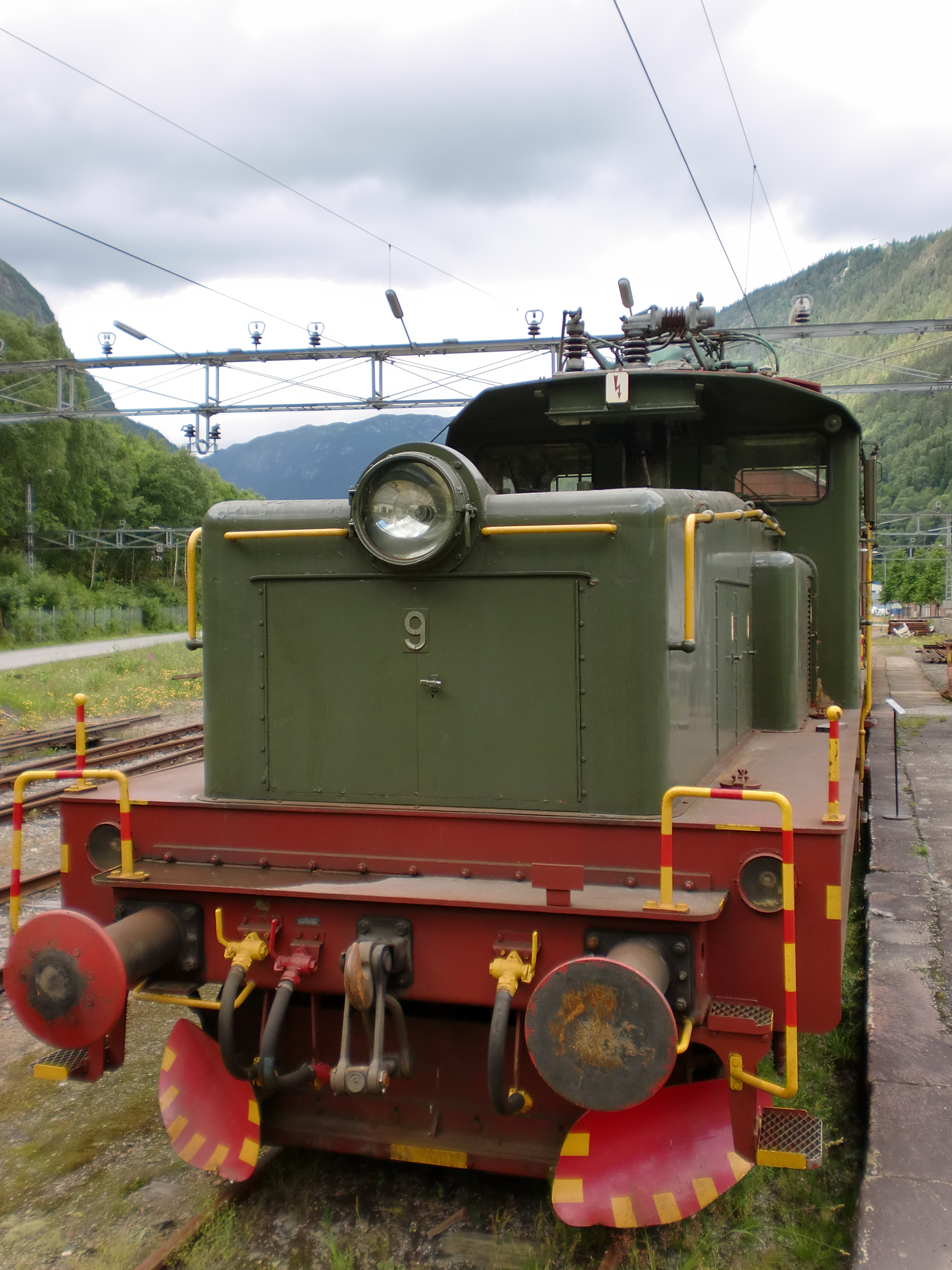
Rj.B 9 at Rjukan station July 2012

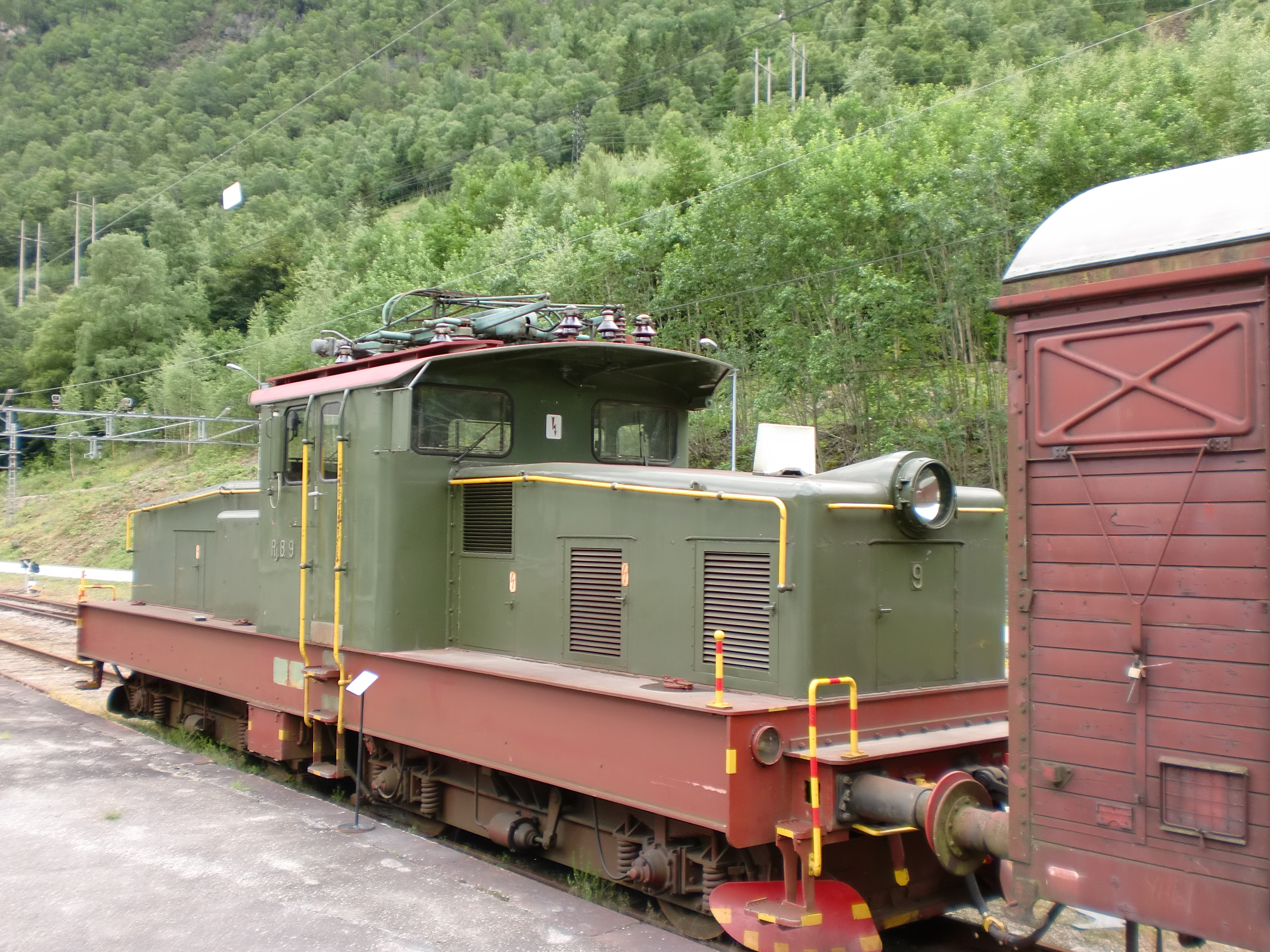
Rj.B 9 at Rjukan station July 2012

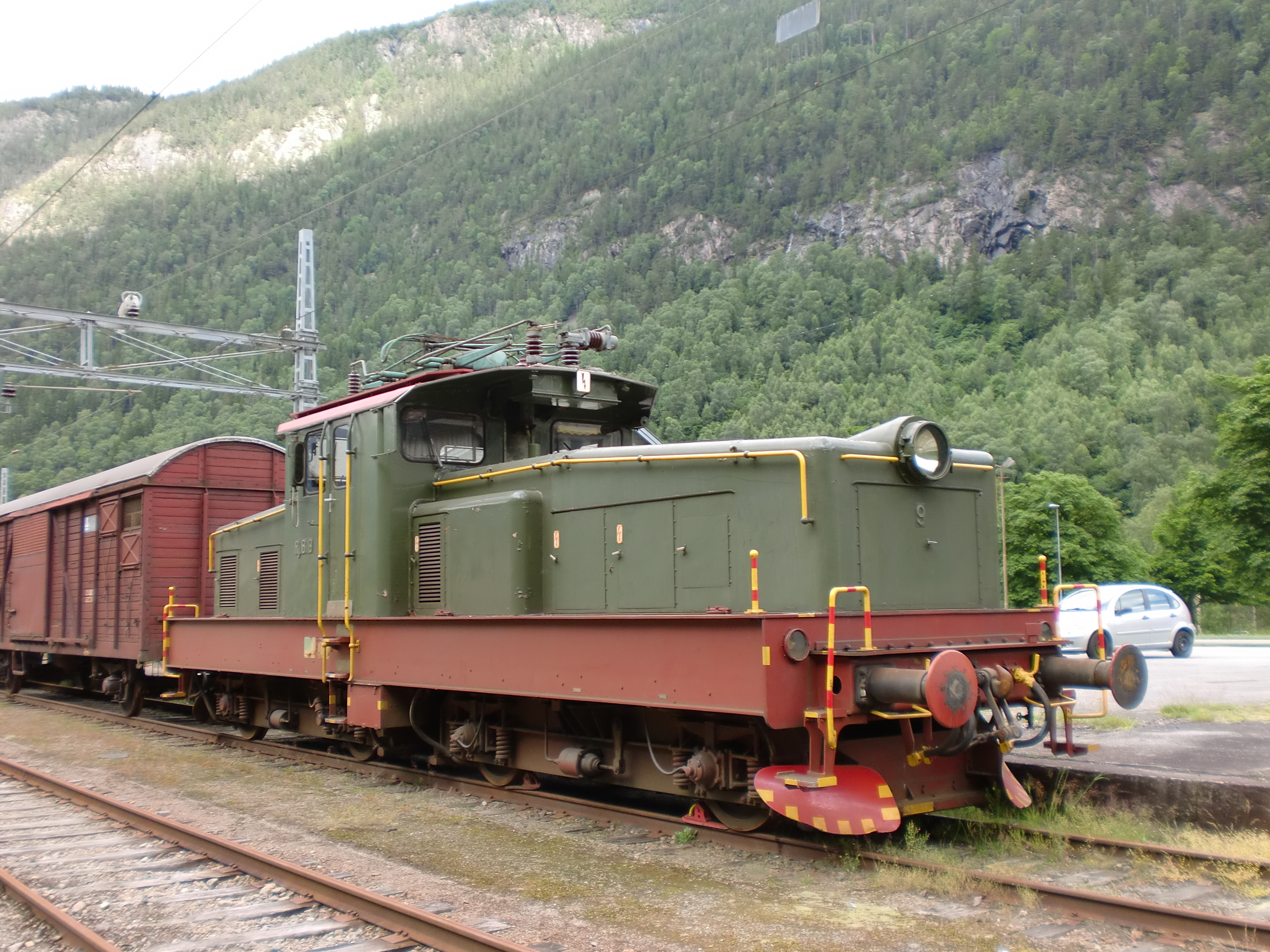
Rj.B 9 at Rjukan station July 2012

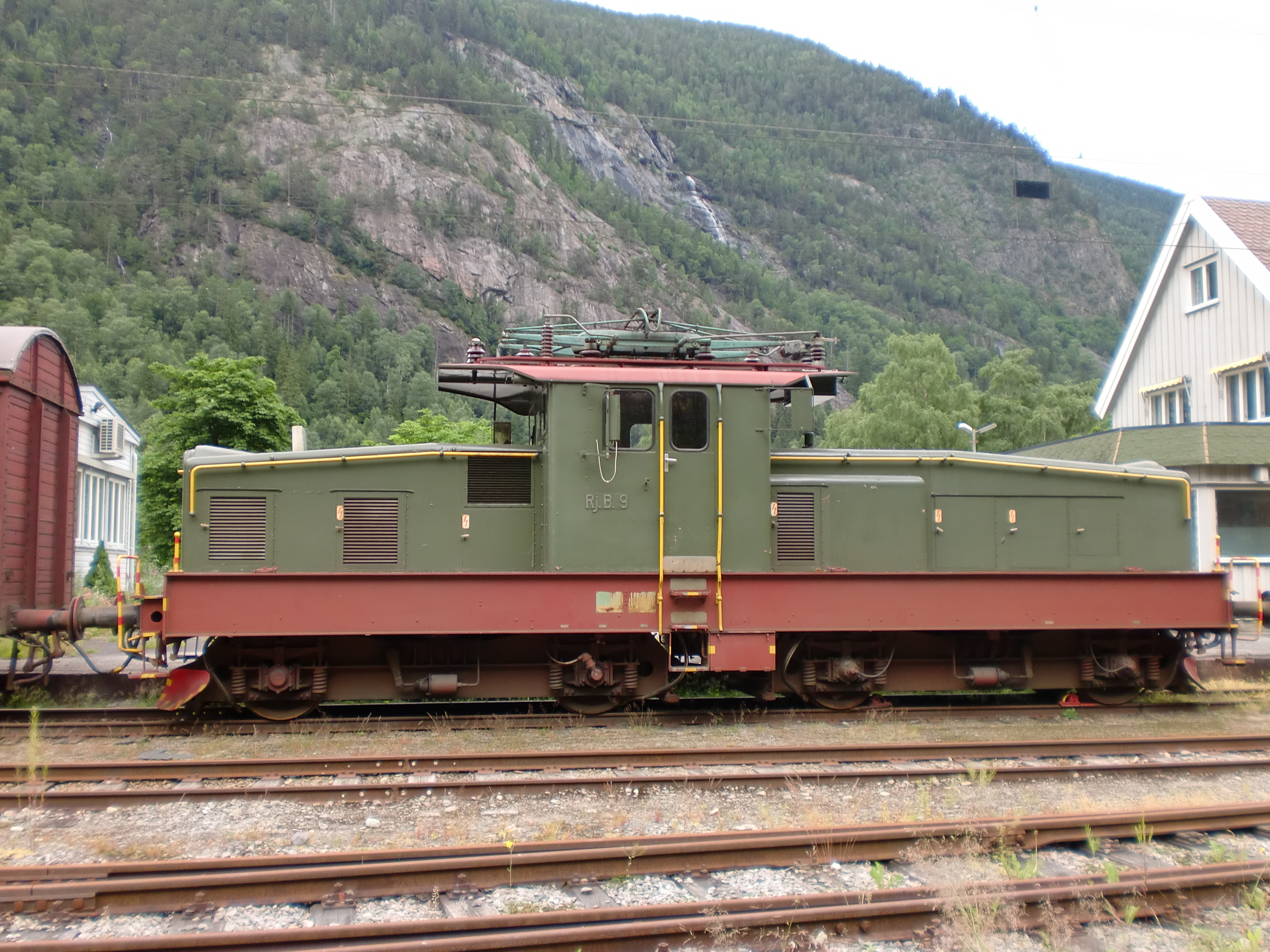
Rj.B 9 at Rjukan station Juli 2012

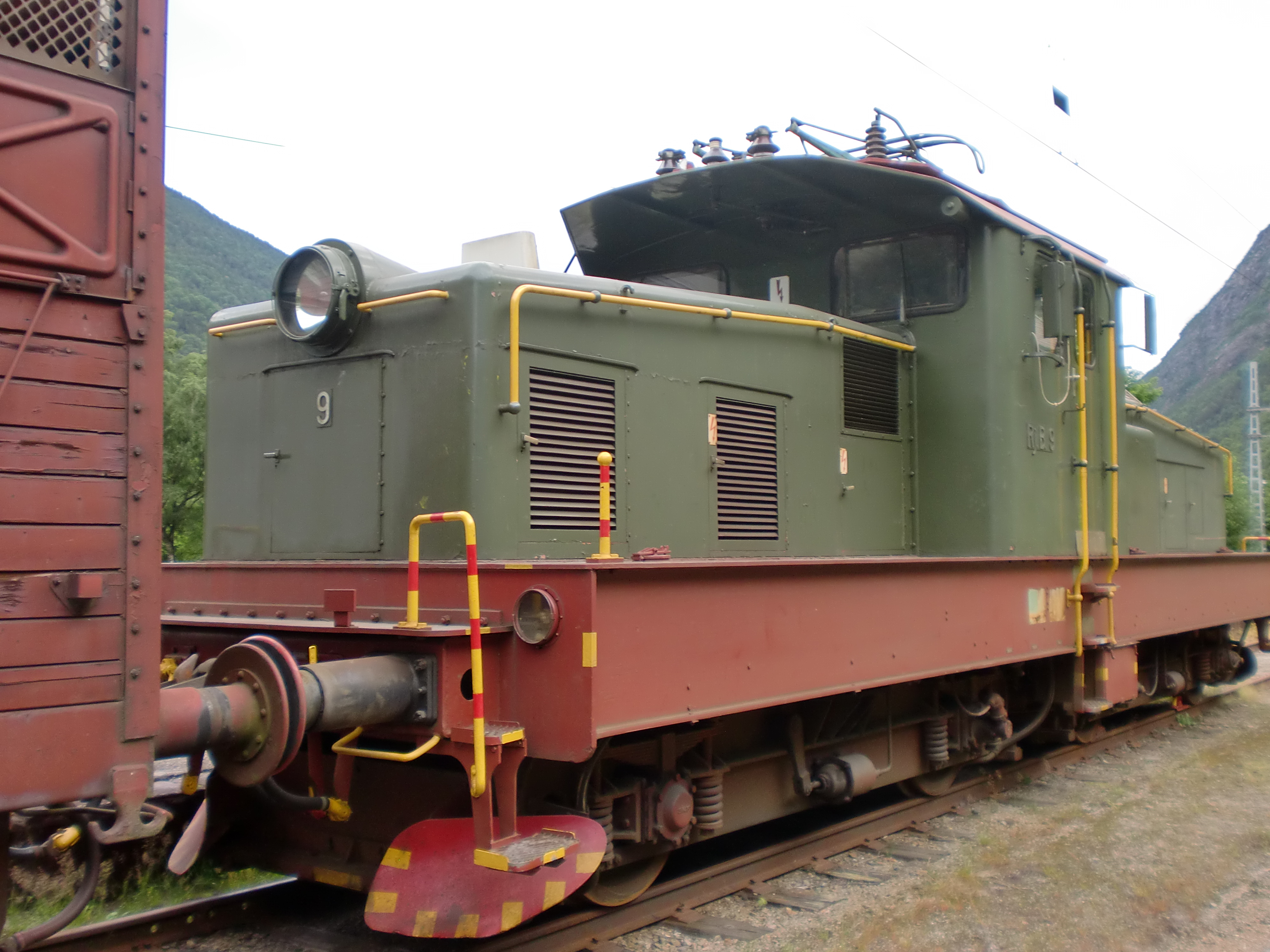
Rj.B 9 at Rjukan station July 2012

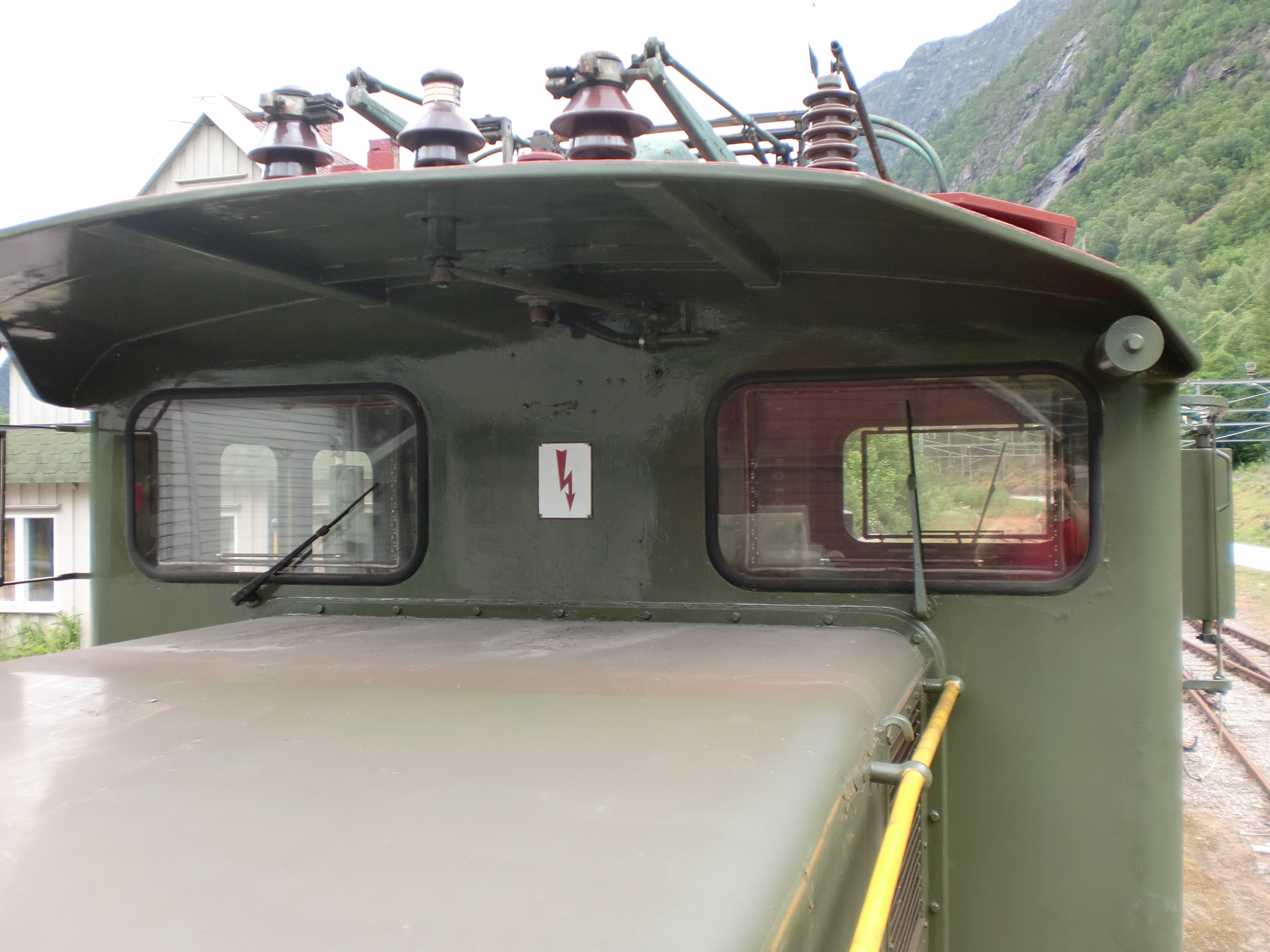
The cab front, Rj.B 9 at Rjukan station July 2012

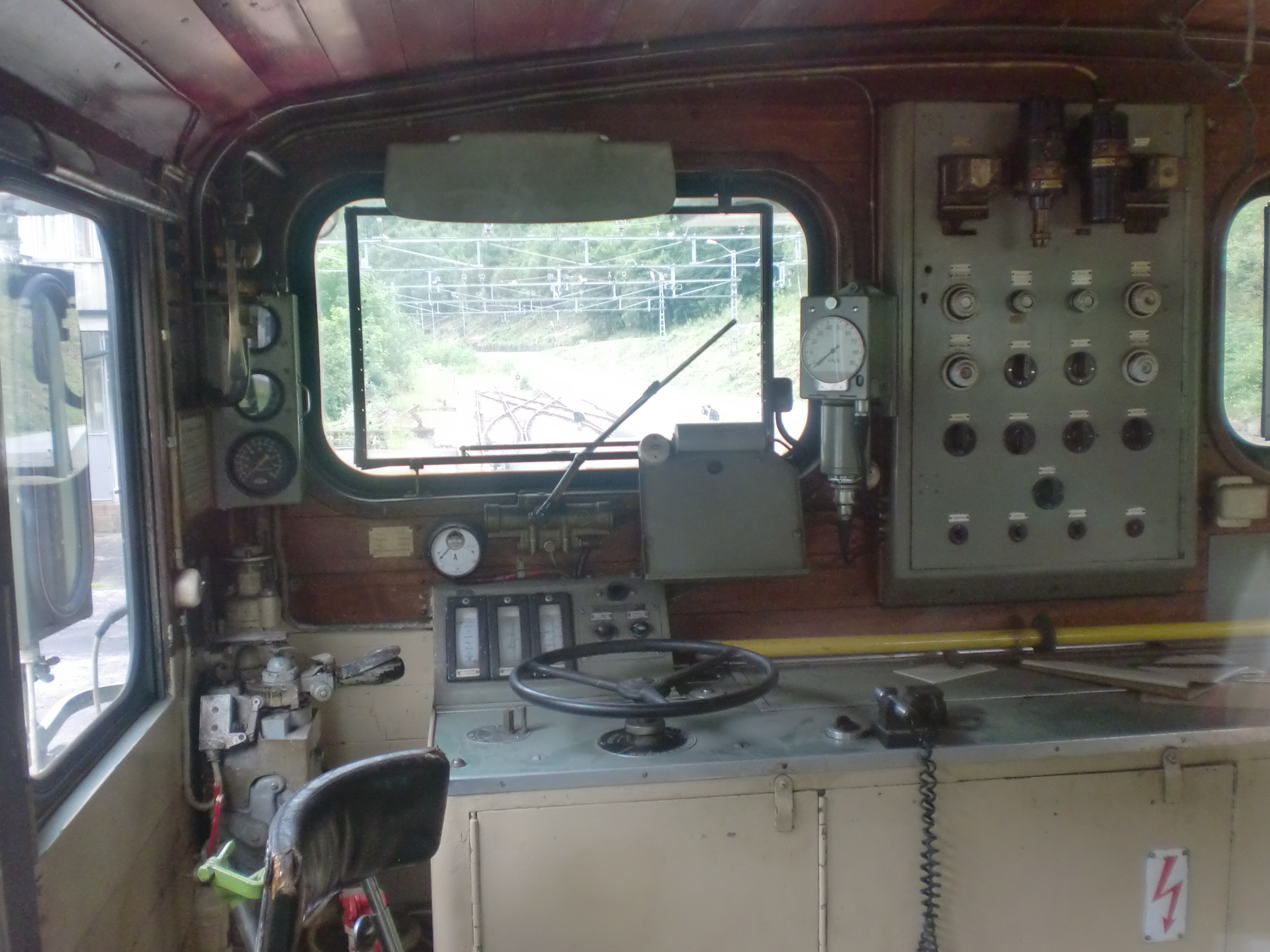
Cab, left side, Rj.B 9 at Rjukan station July 2012

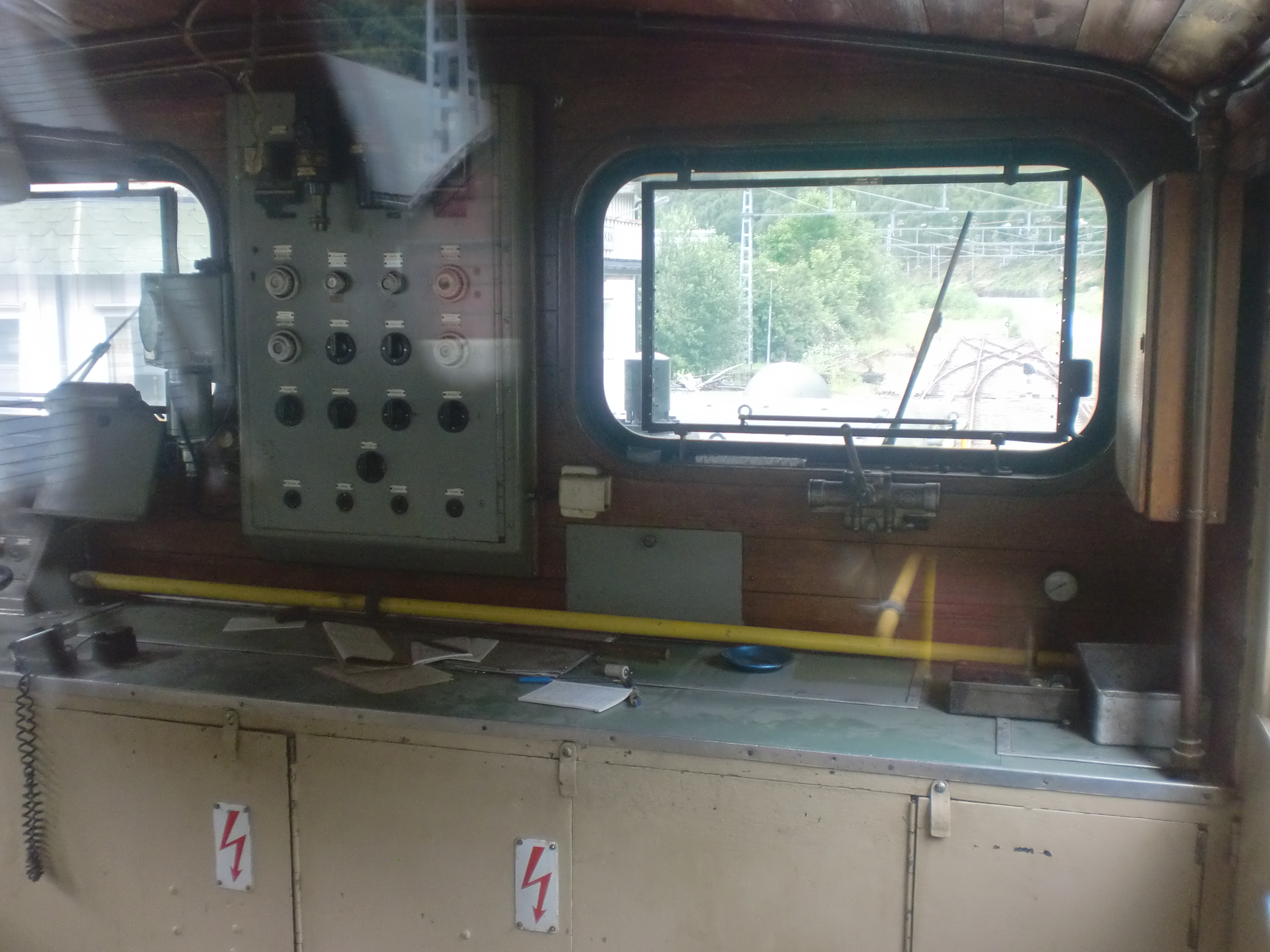
Cab, right side, Rj.B 9 at Rjukan station July 2012

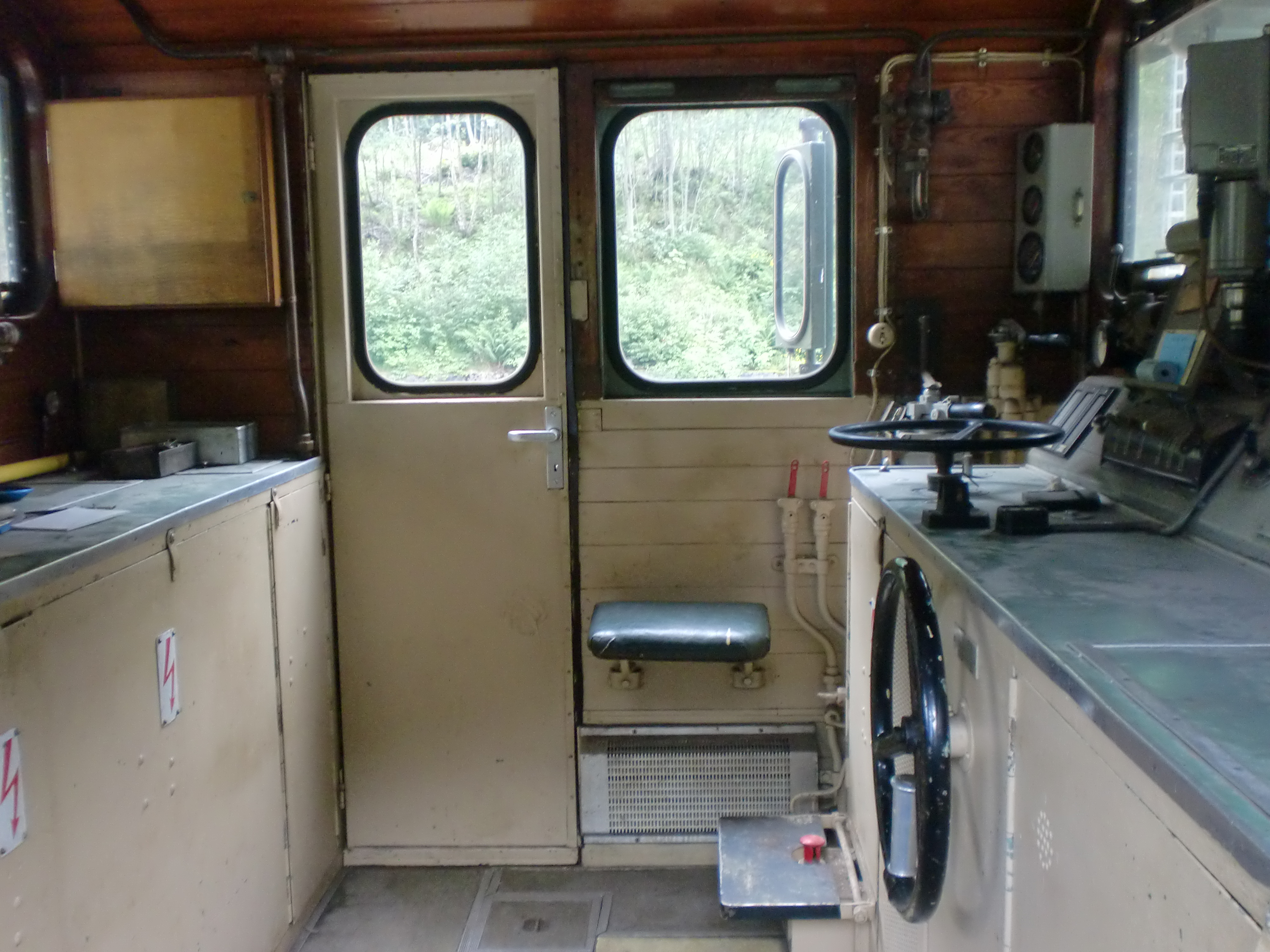
Inside cab, side, Rj.B 9 at Rjukan station July 2012

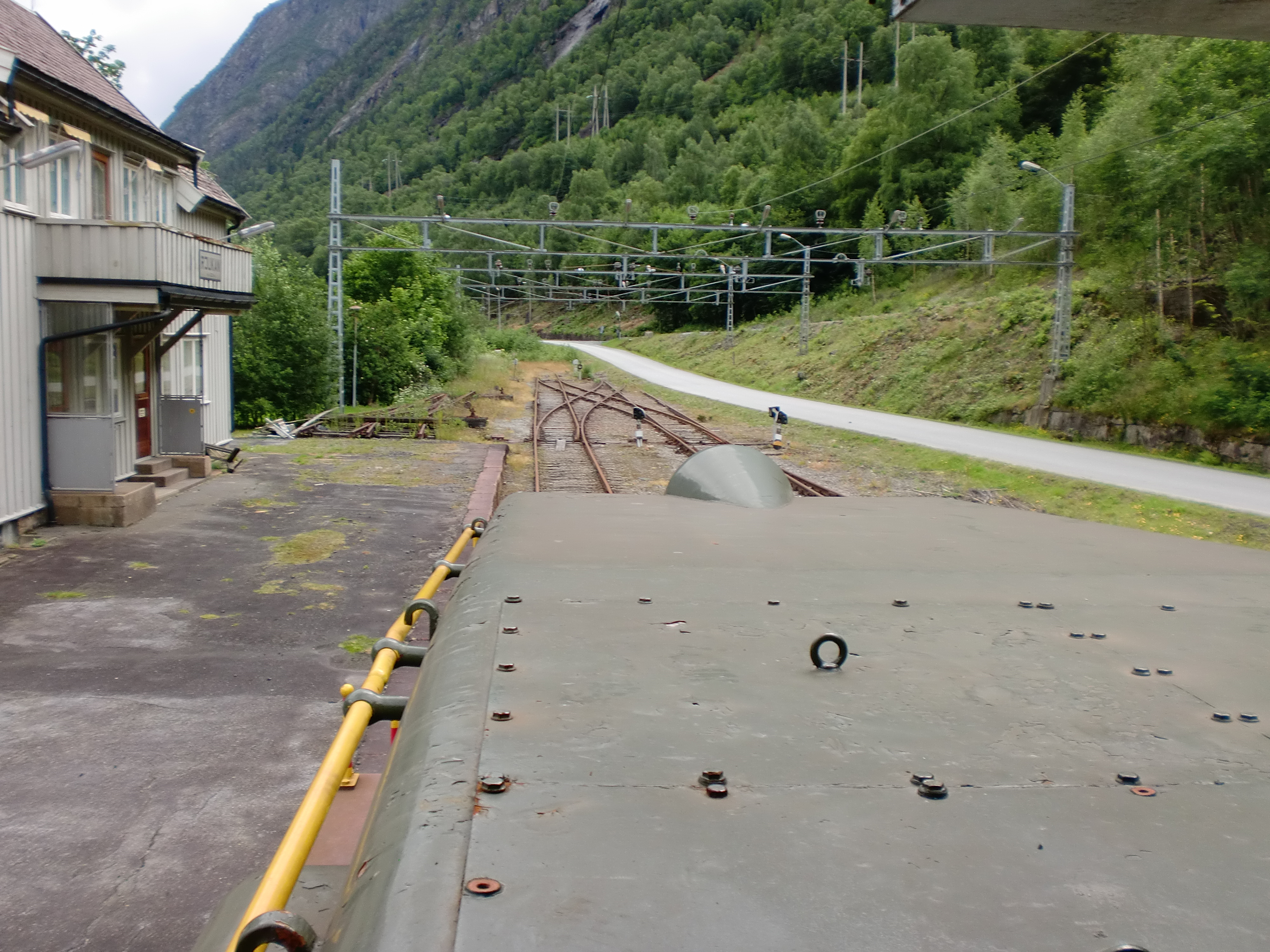
View forward, Rj.B 9 at Rjukan station July 2012

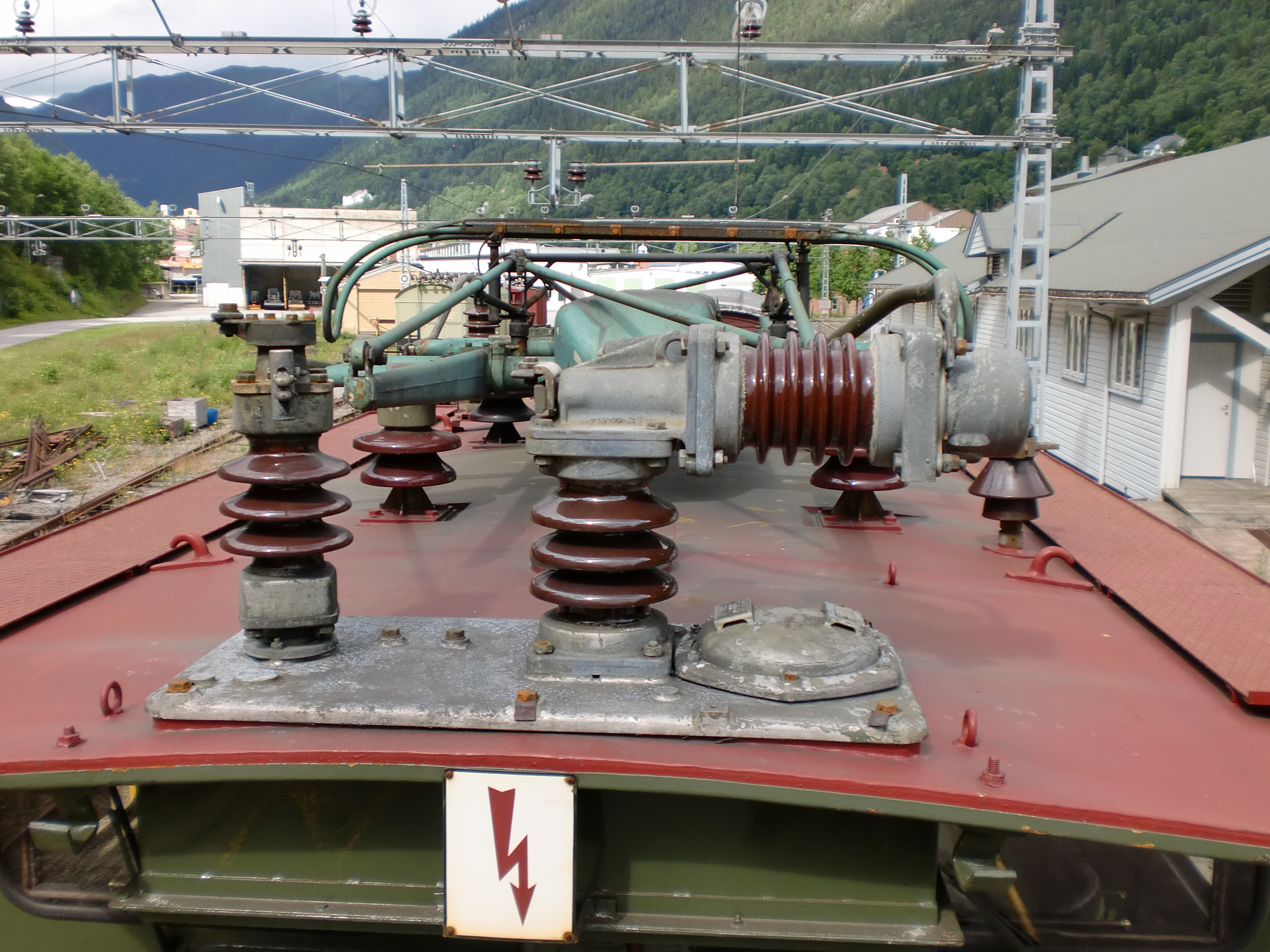
Roof equipment, Rj.B 9 at Rjukan station July 2012

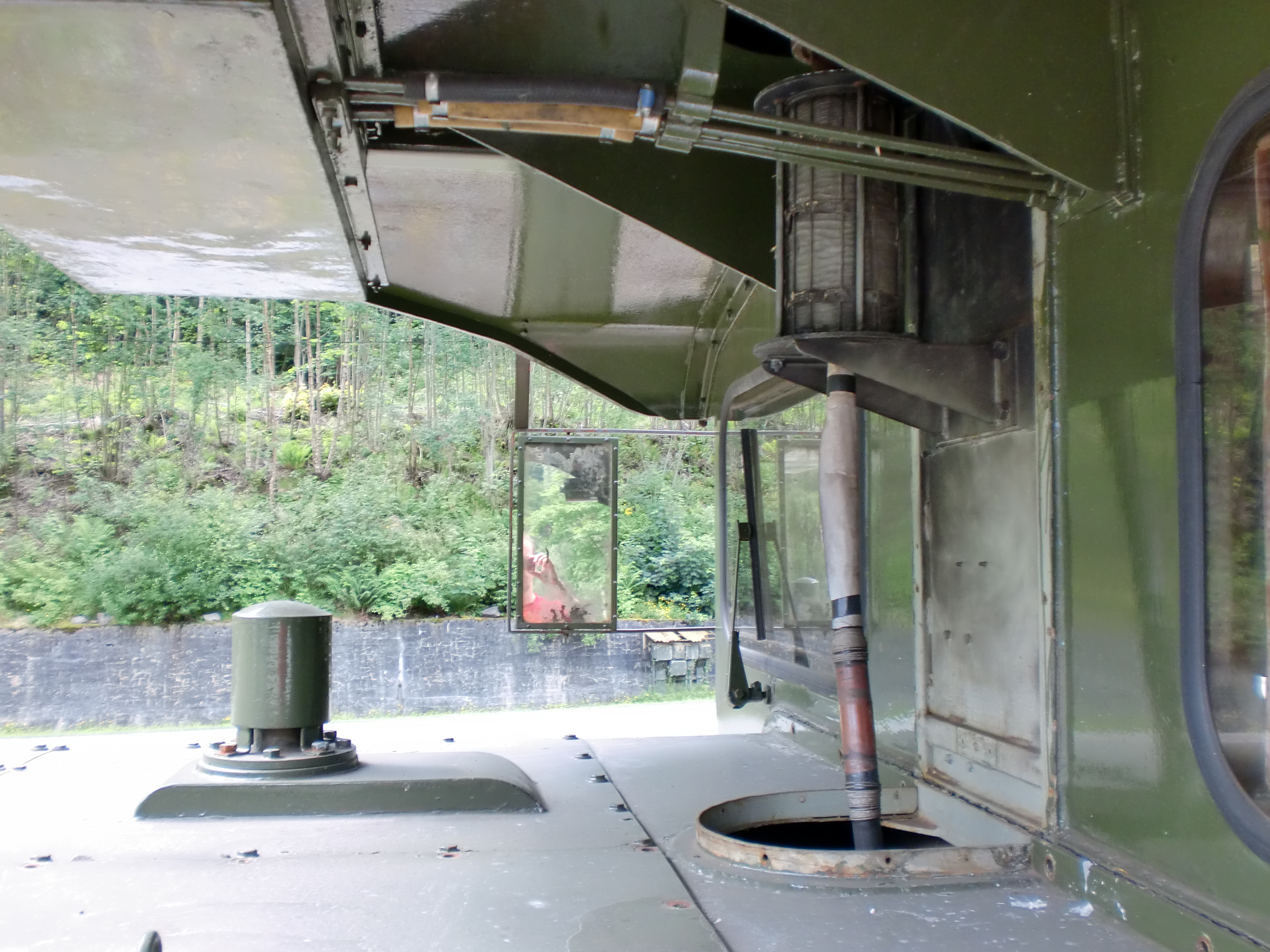
High voltage cable from Roof in front of the cab, Rj.B 9 at Rjukan station July 2012
