= Rjukan Line =

Railway line in Vestfjorddalen, Norway

Norwegian: Rjukanbanen
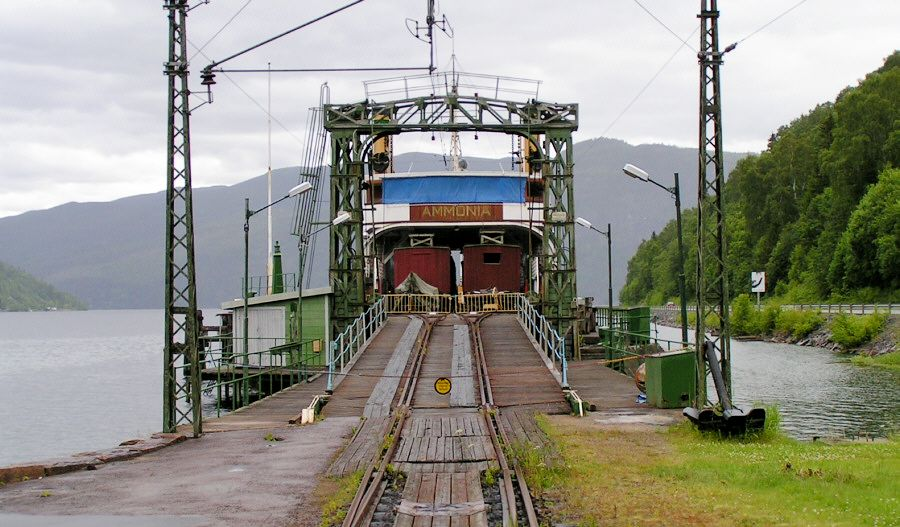
- SF Ammonia, at Mæl, where the railway cars were ferried across Lake Tinn
- Terminus: Rjukan Station; Mæl Station

Commercial operations
- Built by: Norsk Transport
- Original gauge: 1,435 mm (4 ft 8 1/2 in) standard gauge
- Original electrification: 15 kV 16.7 Hz AC

Preserved operations
- Stations: 6
- Length: 16 kilometres (10 mi)
- Preserved gauge: 1,435 mm (4 ft 8 1/2 in) standard gauge
- Preserved electrification: 15 kV 16.7 Hz AC

Commercial history
- Opened: 9 August 1909
- Closed: 1991

The Rjukan Line (Norwegian: Rjukanbanen), at first called the Vestfjorddal Line, was a 16-kilometre (10 mi) Norwegian railway line running through Vestfjorddalen between Mæl and Rjukan in Telemark county. The railway's main purpose was to transport chemicals from Norsk Hydro's plant at Rjukan to the port at Skien, in addition to passenger transport. At Mæl the wagons were shipped 30 kilometres (19 mi) on the Tinnsjø railway ferry to Tinnoset where they connected to the Tinnoset Line. The Rjukan Line and the ferries were operated by Norsk Transport, a subsidiary of Norsk Hydro.

Construction of the line started in 1907, and it opened two years later. It became the second Norwegian railway to be electrified in 1911. It experienced heavy growth, and had fifteen electric locomotives in use. During World War II it was the scene of the Norwegian heavy water sabotage. After the 1960s production declined, and the railway was closed in 1991. It was kept as a heritage railway.

== History ==
=== Background ===
The Telemark power-based industry started in 1902 when Sam Eyde, along with Norwegian and Swedish investors, bought Rjukan Falls—establishing A/S Rjukanfos on 30 April 1903. The same year, on 13 February, Eyde and Kristian Birkeland had met and started working on refining the electric arc to produce an electric flame; allowing Eyde to complete his process of converting air and electricity into fertilizer. On 19 December 1903 Det Norske Kvælstofkompagni was founded, followed by Det Norske Aktieselskap for Eletrokemisk Industri (today Elkem) in 1904; both were in part owned by the Wallenberg family, Stockholms Enskilda Bank and Banque de Paris et des Pays-Bas.

The test plant in Notodden started operation on 2 May 1905 as the first in the world to produce synthetic potassium nitrate. On 2 December 1905 Norsk Hydro-Elektrisk Kvælstofaktieselskab (now Norsk Hydro) was founded, and plans to start a new plant in Rjukan were initialized; moving closer to the source of power would improve efficiency and not make it possible for the newly independent Government of Norway to hinder construction of hydroelectric power by foreign investors—a major political issue at the time. Rjukanfos applied for permission to build a power line from Rjukan to Notodden, but on 18 June 1907 the Norwegian Parliament did not accept the application, despite an offer from Eyde that the state would receive escheat after eighty years, in part because the state would have to guarantee 18 million kr for the project.

In the meantime, the issue of a pure industrial versus a general purpose railway line had stirred local protests, since Norsk Hydro had indicated they were not interested in building a railway to serve the general public. At the time it was common that lines built primarily for single-company freight transport would involve the subsidized operation of passenger and general cargo trains, at the expense of the railway owner. Heavy local protests were transmitted to parliament in 1906, but by the next year an agreement was made for the construction of a general purpose line. On 13 April 1907 Norsk Hydro and the German group Badische Anilin- und Soda-Fabrik (today BASF) made an agreement for the creation of the factory at Rjukan, Rjukan Salpeterfabrik, and at the same time created Norsk Transportaktieselskap—both companies were owned as 50/50 joint ventures. Norsk Transport received a concession to build—with necessary expropriations and operate a railway for thirty years on 17 July 1907. The companies had a stock equity of NOK 34 million.

=== Construction ===
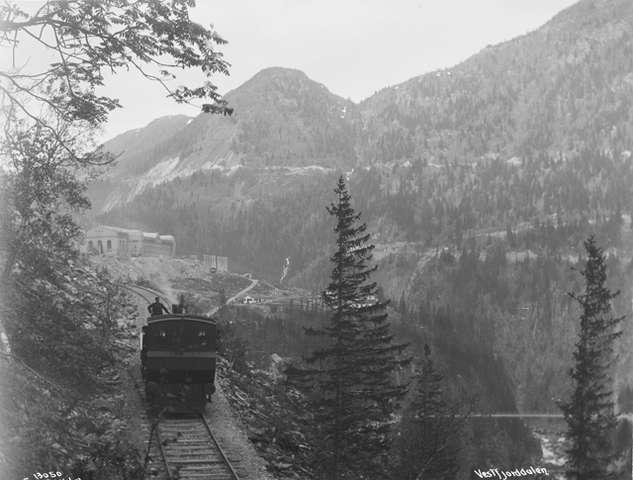
The Rjukan Line on May 26, 1911, before electrification

By the time the concession was given construction of the railway had already started. At the most 2,000 workers were involved in the construction of the plant, the Rjukan Line, and the Tinnoset Line. This was in addition to the Svelgfoss Power Station and a new potassium nitrate factory in Notodden. During the construction one worker lost his life in a landslide, while two survived the accident. Housing was provided in simple barracks, and few laborers came with family. Prostitution and the sale of illegal liquor during the prohibition flourished; the lack of proper law enforcement making Vestfjorddalen known as a lawless valley.

The Rjukan Line was built with a maximum gradient of 1.5%. In addition to the line to the plant, a branch line went to the hydroelectric power station at Vemork; completed in 1908 it would only be used for service technicians to the power station and had a gradient of 5.7%. Construction in Vestfjorddalen was led by Sigurd Kloumann.

During May 1908 the workers were not being paid regularly enough, and took to a strike on 6 June; 2,120 men were at the most in strike. As a consequence Norsk Hydro became a member of Confederation of Norwegian Enterprise (NAF). Negotiations were conducted in August, but failed—not until Minister of Labour Nils Claus Ihlen meddled and Sam Eyde pulled Norsk Hydro out of NAF and reduced his demands did the strike end, on 6 October.

Laying of the tracks started during the fall of 1908, and on 18 February 1909 the first train from Notodden to Vestfjorddalen ran. The official opening of the line from Notodden to Rjukan occurred on 9 August, performed by King Haakon VII—despite the mayor of Tinn referring to the monarch as "the Swedish King Oscar II".

The line was initially operated by steam locomotives, however the cost of steam power was large; and on 7 June 1910 a contract with Allgemeine Elektricitäts-Gesellschaft (today AEG) of Berlin was signed to provide overhead wires and five electric locomotives. The Rjukan Line became the second electrified railway in Norway, after the Thamshavn Line, and the first that would be connected to the main railway network. The first electric locomotive was taken into operation on 30 November 1911. Because only some of the locomotives were delivered, steam locomotive had to help with the service. Because of insufficient safety routines there were several fatalities among employees, and not until 1922 was sufficient policy initiated.

=== Ships ===
In 1907 the first ferry, an unmotorized barge named Tinnsjø was completed; the steam ship Skarsfos was used to haul it between the two railways. The first self-propelled ferry was SF Rjukanfos, a 338 GRT ferry launched in 1909. She got a major overhaul in 1915 after the sister ship SF Hydro at 494 gross register tons was launched the same year. The third steamship was SF Ammonia at 929 gross register tons. Lake Tinn freezes in winter, and all the ships had to be built as icebreakers. The ferries transported the wagons and passengers 30 kilometres (19 mi) across Lake Tinn; until 1936 Norsk Transport had to compete with a passenger steamship service, but after their closing the railway ferries were responsible for all passenger traffic on the lake, which also helped boost passenger traffic on the trains.

=== The first years ===
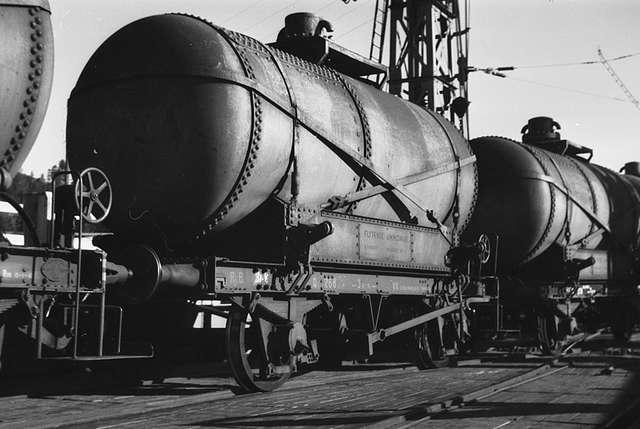
Wagons of ammonia, in the late 1940s

The first potassium nitrate was transported on 8 December 1911, and two years later the plants were making a profit. Transported cargo increased from 110,000 tonnes per year to 250,000 tonnes in 1915, after the plant had been expanded, and up to 345,000 tonnes in 1917. The small hamlet of Rjukan had turned into a town, and in 1920 there were 11,651 people in Tinn. The 1920 were a tough time, and cargo decreased, but in 1929 the electric arc technology was replaced by the ammonia method, with the main product being potassium nitrate. During the 1930s other products came into production, including hydrogen and other gases, and from 1934 as the first plant in the world mass-produced heavy water.

Passenger transport was of two types; trains that corresponded with the ferries and connected with trains at Tinnoset, and commuter trains transporting workers to the plants at Rjukan. The commuter trains were initiated in 1913, and Norsk Hydro started building housing at Ingolfsland and Tveito, and both Ingolfsland and Miland got their own stops, and from 1919 stations. The two kilometers (one mile) commuter train from Rjukan to Ingolfsland took five minutes; a month pass cost NOK 2.50 for employees and their families. There were seventeen departures in each direction per week, timed to fit with the working times at the plant. This increased to 58 in 1916, when a new stop at Tveito was opened.

The passenger transport to Mæl was performed by connecting passenger wagons to the freight trains. Up to ten trains were operated each direction each day, and up to five would correspond with the ferry; at Tinnoset trains would operate to Skien, and connection at Hjuksebø allowed for transport to Oslo Vestbanestasjon. In 1928 Norsk Transport and NSB agreed to operate a weekly night train service from Rjukan to Oslo; the service lasted until 1933. During the 1930s NSB and Norsk Hydro initiated an attempt to attract tourists to Rjukan, through discounted direct trains from Oslo, Drammen and Skien. They were taken up again after the war, and remained until 1969.

=== World War II ===
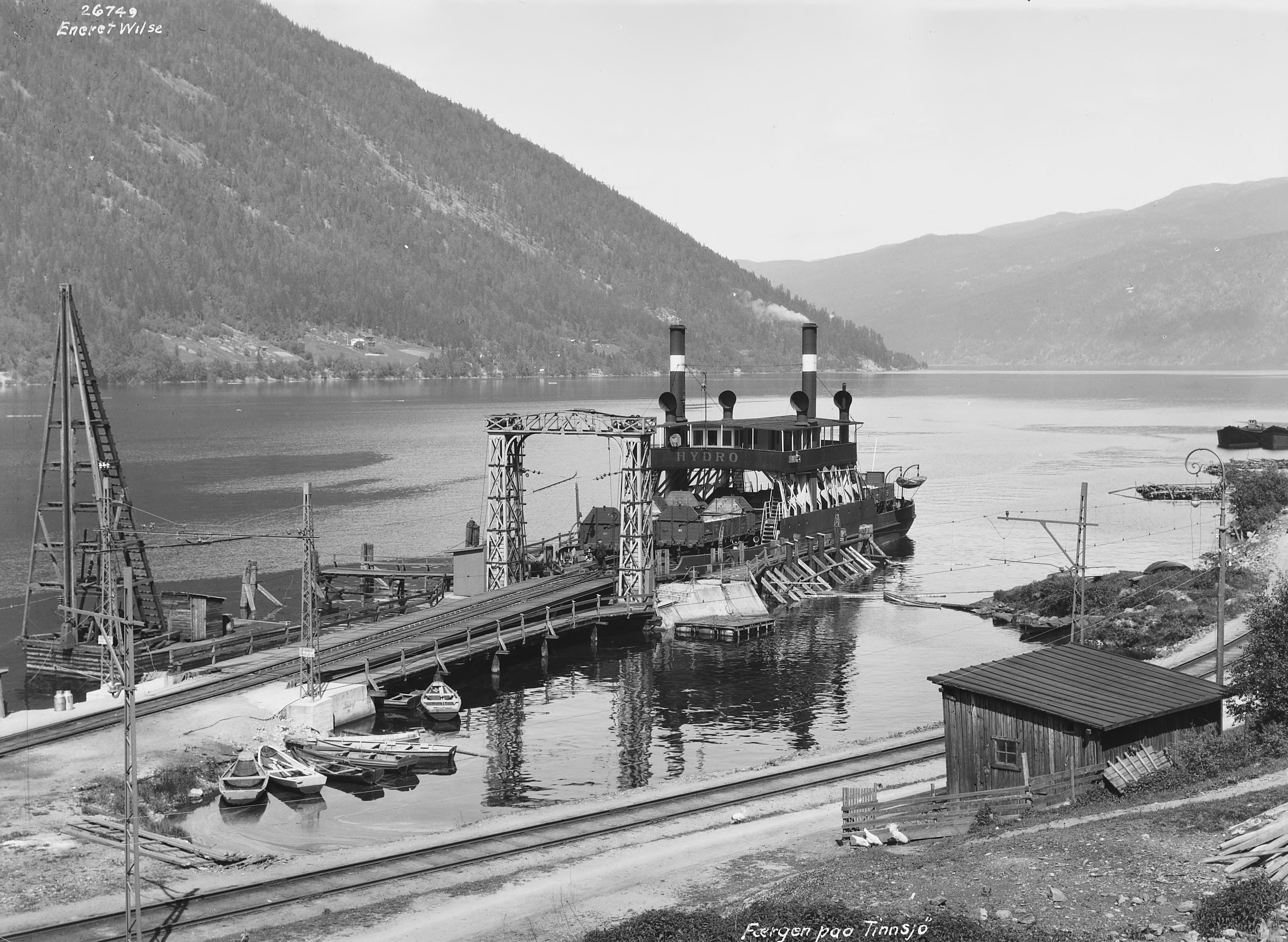
D/F Hydro at Mæl in 1925

The German occupation of Norway (1940–1945) during World War II made the Rjukan Line the area for a massive struggle in between the Norwegian resistance movement and the Third Reich. In February 1940, before the occupation, the entire Vestfjorddalen and the docks closed for foreigners. On 4 May 1940 German troops reached Rjukan, a month after the invasion of Norway had started. The ferries were camouflaged and by January 1941 lack of coal resulted in the steamships being fired by wood.

One of the by-products at Rjukan was the production of heavy water—a key component in nuclear reactors, and necessary for the Germany designs as a moderator. The hydrogen plant at Vemork was the first mass producer of heavy water, and in 1939 IG Farben, who owned 25% of Norsk Hydro at the time, asked to import five liters of heavy water, but was denied due to lack of an export license. In early 1940, the entire stock of 185 kg was shipped to Paris, loaned to the French nuclear physics program at the College de France. In 1939–40 production at Vemork was 20 kilograms, by 1942 production had increased to five kilograms per day.

The first attempt from the resistance was Operation Grouse in October 1942, but failed and caught by the Germans; as a consequence passenger transport after 7 April 1942 from Ingolfsland Station to Rjukan was only permitted for soldiers, police, workers at the plant and schoolchildren. All filled ammonia wagons were stored indoors in a tunnel with heavy guarding. On 16 November 1943 the US Army Air Forces bombed the hydrogen plant; the attack killed 21 civilians but failed to touch the plant itself, located underneath seven stories of reinforced concrete. The secondary targets of the attack were the station at Rjukan, the industrial tracks and the track to Vemork. The attack caused great damage to the railway with locomotives No.7 and 8, eight cargo wagons and seven passenger wagons suffering damage. Total costs for the bombings were NOK 245,611, most of it related to rolling stock.

The Germans decided to cancel production of heavy water at Rjukan, and move the remains of the potassium hydroxide—from which the heavy water was distilled—was to be transported to Germany. The resistance movement was aware of this plan, and considered blowing up the train at various places, but instead chose to target the ferry SF Hydro. The night before the shipment went the saboteurs entered the ship and placed a bomb in the hull, timed so the ferry would blow at the deepest point of the lake, but at the same time close to land to help save the civilians on board. The attack was successful, the ship sank to 430 metres (1,410 ft) depth with 47 people on board, including eight German soldiers, a crew of seven and the cargo of heavy water. 29 people survived.

=== Climax ===
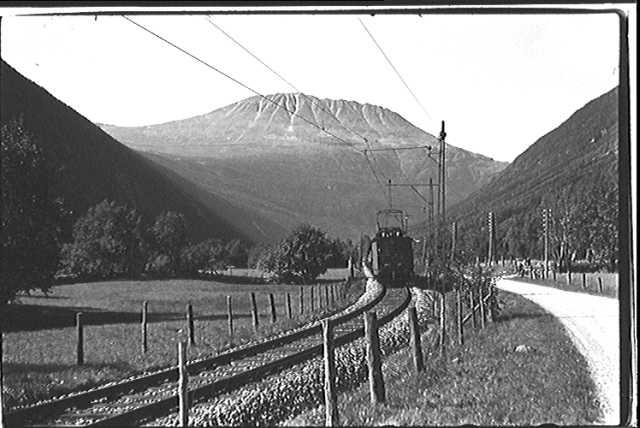
Locomotive hauling a train down Vestfjorddalen

After the end of the war Norsk Hydro had a strong liquidity, while the Green Revolution and increased industrialization of agriculture in Europe boomed the demand for the products; from 1945 to 1955 production increased eightfold. The increased transport was a heavy burden on the two steamships, and in 1953 Norsk Transport ordered MF Storegut, a diesel powered ship of 1,119 GRT. She was launched on 25 May 1956, and the two older ferries were put to reserve duty in the meantime. A number of upgrades were made to the line, and the two locomotives 9 and 10 were bought in 1958. This was followed by the three diesel locomotives 20, 21 and 22 from Henschel. In 1966 two NSB El 1 locomotives were bought, and the voltage on the line increased from 10 to 15 kV.

In 1957 five round trips had to be made each day, while the trains made nine round trips from Rjukan to Mæl. Rjukan station handled 100 wagons, with 800 tonnes potassium nitrate and 400 tonnes ammonia; by 1962 723,482 tonnes were transported on the Rjukan Line, 14% of the transported amount of NSB (excluding the ore trains on the Ofoten Line). In total 30 million tonnes on 1,5 million carloads were transported from 1911 to 1991.

=== Decline ===
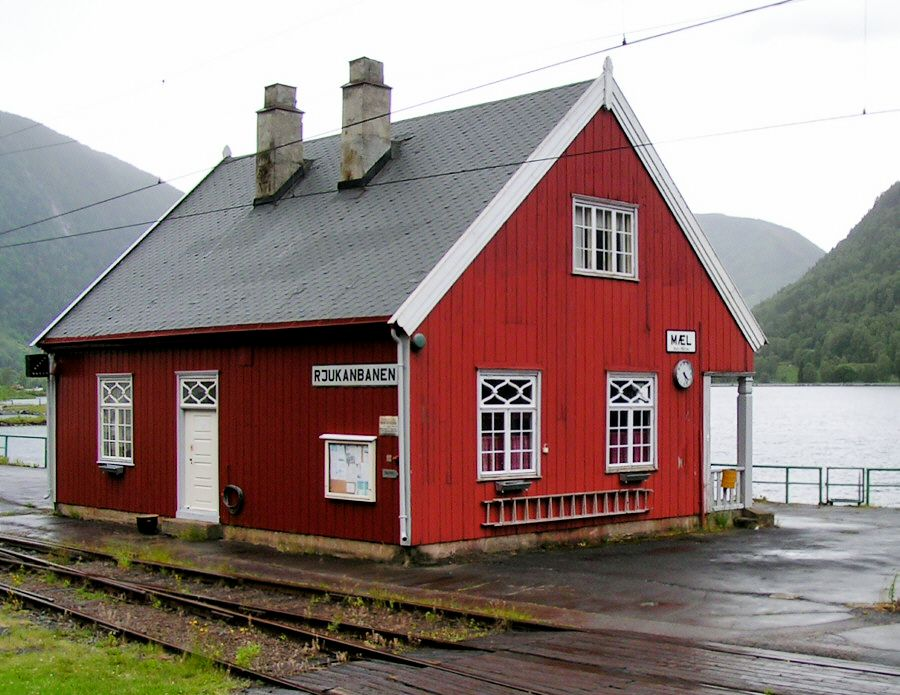
Mæl Station, the terminus of the Rjukan Line where the wagons were transferred to the railway ferry

Norsk Hydro announced in 1963 a savings plan for its four plants in Norway; Chief Executive Officer Rolf Østbye made it clear that new technology in the production of ammonia would force the closure of the plant at Rjukan, and replace it with a petroleum-based process at Herøya. The Rjukan situation, as it was named in the press, became a source of conflict between the local community and Norsk Hydro; initially 250 jobs were to be moved to Herøya, but in 1964 Norsk Hydro applied for permission to build a power line from Rjukan to Herøya—what would become the death sentence for the Rjukan Line. Permission for the construction of the power line was granted in 1968. Production of fertilizer was moved to Herøya and Glomfjord, and Rjukan transferred to production of kalkammonsalpeter in 1963 and ammonium nitrate in 1964.

During the 1960s a series of cost reductions were introduced on the line, after major reorganizations between 1965 and 1970; the last commuter train for the workers to the plants went on 25 May 1968, while on 31 May 1970 the last passenger train in connection with the ferries went on Rjukan Line, being replaced with bus. In 1972 Norsk Transport applied to terminate passenger transport with the railway ferry, since they were operating trips with only passengers and no cargo. The application was declined by the Norwegian Ministry of Transport and Communications, but in 1978 they permitted that the Saturday afternoon and Sunday departures be terminated—these were not used to transport freight trains. By the mid eighties passenger numbers had fallen dramatically, and in 1985 the department gave in and permitted the termination of passenger services with Storegut and Ammonia.

The plan had been producing a deficit since 1982. Norsk Hydro made an agreement with the authorities where they would create 350 new permanent jobs, create a business fund and donate NOK 60 million for the construction of a new road, Route 37 along Lake Tinn. In 1988 Norsk Hydro terminated the ammonia production, and in 1991 they also closed down the production ammonium nitrate and potassium nitrate, along with the Rjukan Line. Within a few years the number of Norsk Hydro employees in Rjukan had been reduced from 1,760 to 530 people; 24 of these were employed by Norsk Transport operating the railway and railway ferries. All the employees were either retired or moved to other areas of Norsk Hydro's enterprise.

The last train ran on 4 July 1991, four days after the plant closed. Without production at the plants there was no need for the railway; it would be more economical to transport the few last products by truck. The final journey hauled several wagons down to the coast for scrapping. The closing of the Rjukan Line also terminated operations on the Tinnoset Line, where passenger traffic had remained until 1991.

== Rolling stock ==
Locomotives
Road number	Traction	Builder	Built	Service	Wheels	Weight	Power	Speed	Fate
1	Steam	Sächsische Maschinenfabrik	1901	1908	B	12.7 t		30 km/h	Bought from the Valdres Line; dismantled 1935
2	Steam	Henschel & Sohn	1907	1907–08	B	14.3 t		40 km/h	Sold to Lorentzen & Wettre; dismantled in 1965; NSB class 37
3	Steam	A. Borsig	1908	1908–18	B	13.8 t		40 km/h	Sold to NSB; dismantled in 1957
4 "Odin"	Steam	Orenstein & Koppel	1908	1908–49	B	13 t			Dismantled in 1964
344 & 336	Steam	Baldwin Locomotive Works	1917	1918–65	C	24.7 t		40 km/h	Dismantled in 1969
1, 2, 3, 6, 7 & 8	Electric	AEG/Skabo	1911–18	1911–66	D	44 t	375 kW	45 km/h	NSB El 7
4 & 5	Electric	AEG/Skabo	1912	1912–56	B	23 t	190 kW	45 km/h	NSB El 6
9 & 10	Electric	Sécheron/Jung	1958	1958–91	Bo'Bo'	60 t	732 kW (cont.) 830 kW (1hr.)	55 km/h	
14 & 15	Electric	Per Kure/Thune	1922	1966–91	B'B'	61.3 t	720 kW	70 km/h	NSB El 1
20, 21 & 22	Diesel	Henschel-Werke	1961	1961–91	C	43.5 t	375 kW	60 km/h	

== Reuse as a heritage line ==
After the closing in 1991 the foundation Stiftelsen Rjukanbanen was established to ensure that the railway remained in an operational condition, and kept the two railway ferries and some of the rolling stock in operational condition. Norsk Transport retained for a period maintenance of the Rjukan Line, while the Tinnoset Line remained part of the rail network maintained by the Norwegian National Rail Administration. The foundation operated ad-hoc charter services on both the Tinnoset Line and the Rjukan Line, as well as with both railway ferries. By 2004 the foundation had run out of money, and closed down.

In 2006 the Norwegian Directorate for Cultural Heritage announced they would be working to preserve the railways and ferries, and in 2008 it became clear that the directorate was working with an application for the Rjukan Line, the Tinnoset Line and the ferries to be included in a UNESCO World Heritage Site along with the closed plants in Rjukan and Odda. The line was added to the list of priority technical and industrial cultural heritage by the Norwegian Directorate for Cultural Heritage.
