= Bohus (disambiguation) =

Bohus may refer to:

- Bohus Fortress, Sweden
- Bohuslän, a historical province in Sweden, named after the fortress
- Bohus, a locality, part of Surte, Ale Municipality, Sweden
- Bohus (retailer), Norwegian furniture retailer
- MS Bohus, Norwegian-Swedish ferry
- Gábor Bohus, Hungarian mycologist
- Ted A. Bohus, American film director, producer, actor and writer
