= Ingolfsland Station =

Railway station in Tinn, Norway

Ingolfsland
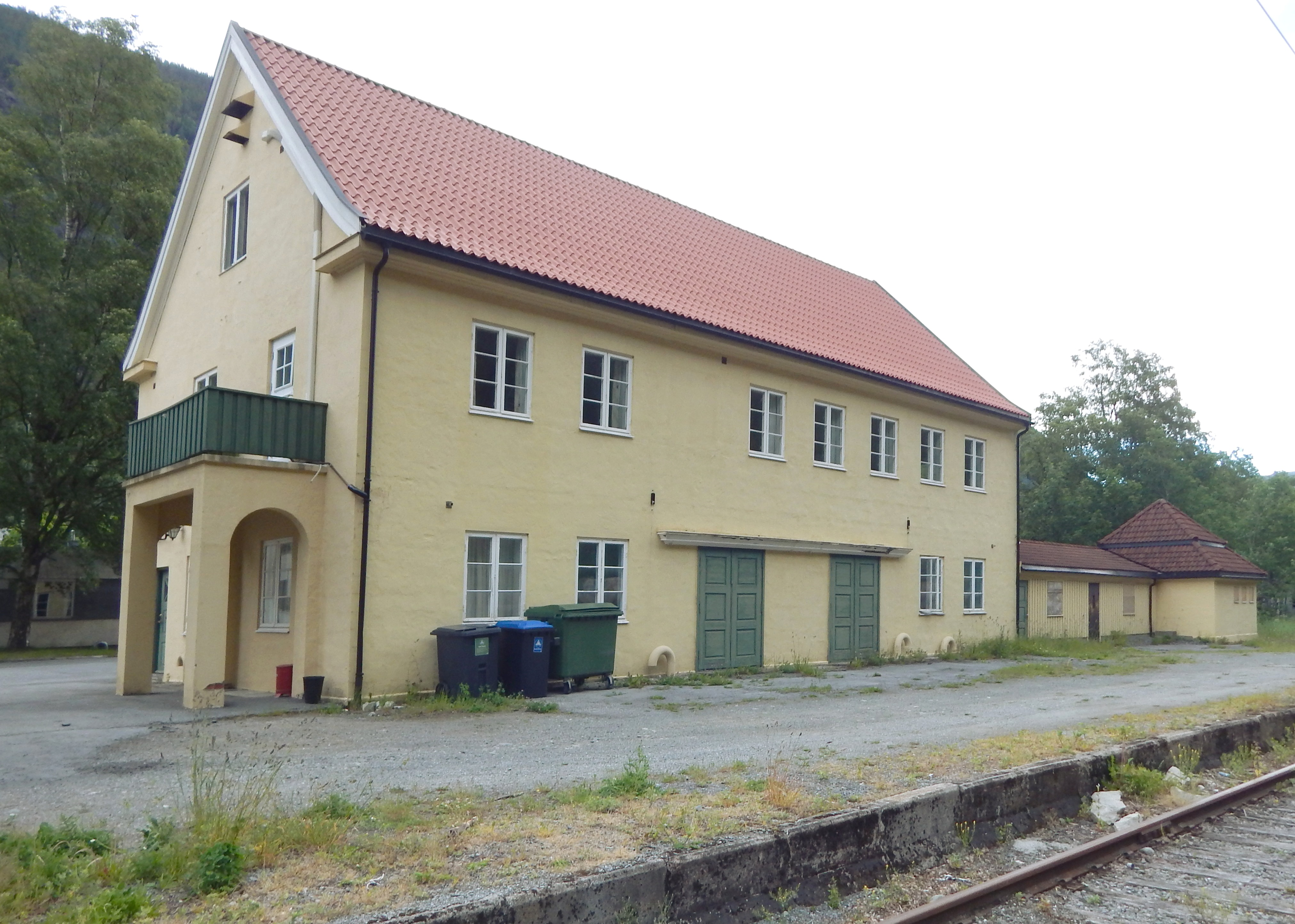

General information
- Location: Rjukan, Tinn Municipality; Norway
- Elevation: 277.0 m (908.8 ft)
- Owner: Norsk Transport
- Operator: Norsk Transport
- Line: Rjukan Line
- Distance: 13.81 km (8.58 mi)
- Platforms: 1

Construction
- Architect: Thorvald Astrup

History
- Opened: 1913
Location

Ingolfsland Station (Norwegian: Ingolfsland stasjon) is an abandoned railway station on the Rjukan Line at Rjukan in Tinn Municipality, Norway. It was in use from 1913 to 1970 by Norsk Transport, serving the southern suburbs of Rjukan.

== History ==
The station opened as a stop in 1913 and was crucial for the commuter trains that transported workers from the outer parts of Rjukan to the plants. It was classified as a station in 1922 after the new building was built; the only brick construction along the line. It had two apartments and a waiting room, in total 200 square meters.

The station became unstaffed in 1969 and was closed on May 31, 1970, when passenger transport on Rjukanbanen terminated. It was sold as a residence in 1985 to the association Odd Fellow, who have renovated it.
