= RjB 20–22 =

Type and origin
- Power type: Diesel-hydraulic
- Builder: Henschel
- Serial number: 30271–30273
- Build date: 1961
- Total produced: 3
Specifications
- Configuration
  - AAR: C
- Gauge: 1,435 mm (4 ft 8 1/2 in)
- Length: 8.9 m (29 ft)
- Loco weight: 44 tonnes (43 long tons; 49 short tons)
Performance figures
- Maximum speed: 60 km/h (37 mph)
- Power output: 368 kW
Career
- Operators: Norsk Transport
- Official name: 20, 21, 22
- Locale: Rjukanbanen

RjB 20, 21 and 22 were three diesel-hydraulic locomotives operated by Norsk Transport on Rjukanbanen in Norway. They were mostly used for shunting at Rjukan and at Mæl.

They were delivered in 1961, and remained in service until 1991 when the line closed; no. 20 remains at Rjukan, while no. 21 was sold to Pepeteries de Golbey of France and no. 22 was transferred to Norsk Hydro at Menstad.
