= NSB El 6 =

Class of Norwegian electric locomotives

Type and origin
- Power type: Electric
- Builder: AEG; Skabo
- Build date: 1911
- Total produced: 1
Specifications
- Configuration
  - UIC: B'
- Gauge: 1,435 mm (4 ft 8 1/2 in)
- Length: 6.6 m (21 ft 8 in)
- Loco weight: 23 t (23 long tons; 25 short tons)
- Electric system/s: 15 kV 16 2/3 Hz AC Catenary
- Current pickup: Pantograph
Performance figures
- Maximum speed: 45 km/h (28 mph)
- Power output: 184 kW (247 hp)
Career
- Operators: Norsk Transport; Norwegian State Railways
- Numbers: RjB.4–5; NSB 6 2503
- Locale: Rjukanbanen
- Retired: 1956

NSB El 6 was a series of two electric locomotive delivered in 1912 to Norsk Transport that operated the Rjukan Line and the Tinnoset Line, where they were designated RjB.4 and 5. The locomotives were built by AEG (motor) and Skabo (chassis) and delivered at the same time as RjB.1–3 (later El 7) locomotives for the electrification of the Rjukan Line.

They were exactly "half" of the larger 1–3 units, with two motors, one pantograph and one transformer.

In 1920 RjB.4 was transferred to Norwegian State Railways and designated El 6, numbered 2503. In 1934 it was rebuilt from 10 to 15 kV and moved to Drammen. It was taken out of service in 1956, while the Rjukan Line took its out of service in 1960; neither have been preserved.
