= NSB El 7 =

Class of Norwegian electric locomotives

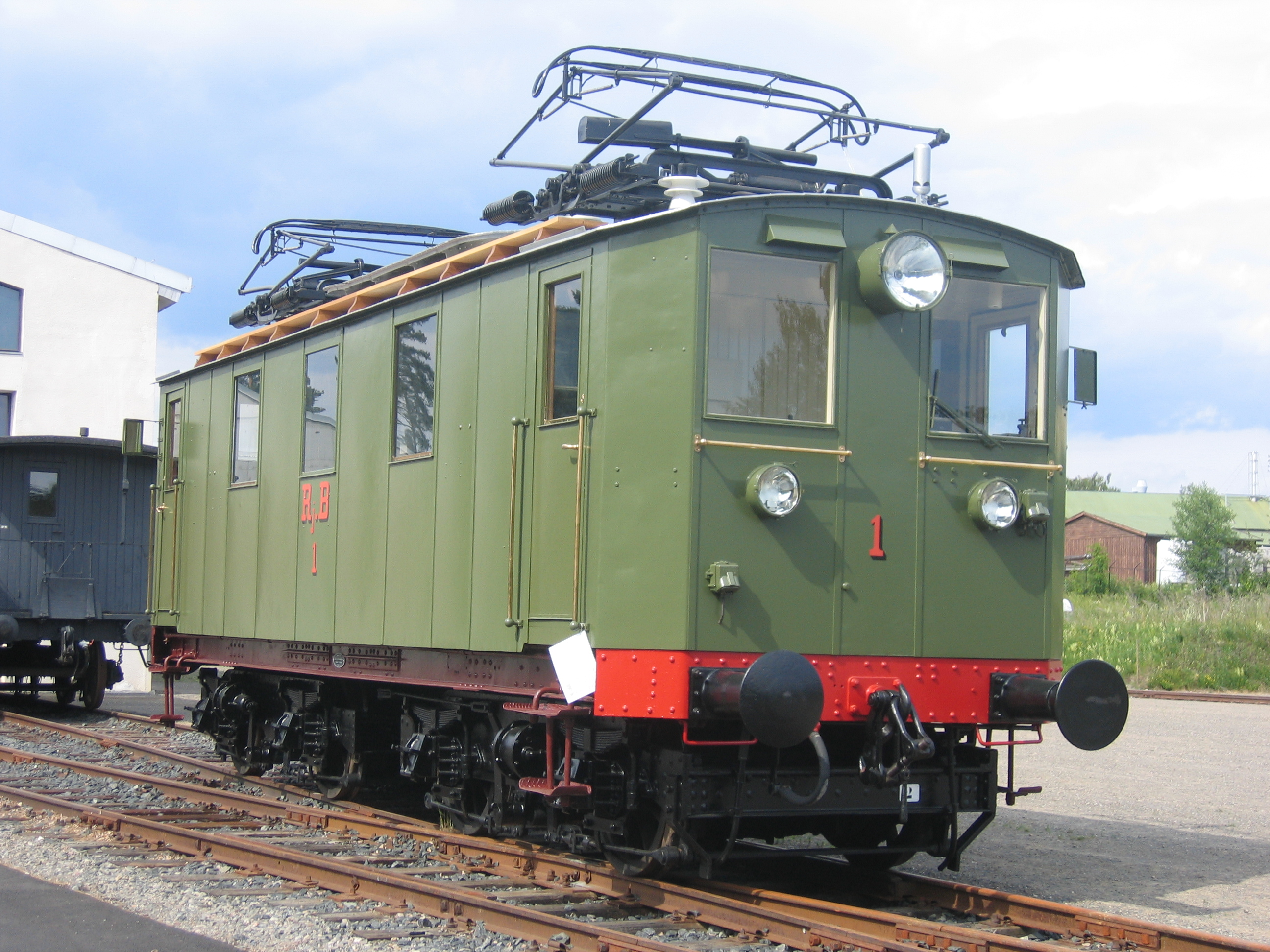
- RjB.1 at the Norwegian Railway Museum
Type and origin
- Power type: Electric
- Builder: AEG; Skabo
- Build date: 1911–1918
- Total produced: 6
Specifications
- Configuration
  - AAR: B-B
  - UIC: Bo'Bo'
- Gauge: 1,435 mm (4 ft 8 1/2 in)
- Length: 7.3 m (23 ft 11 in)
- Loco weight: 48 t (47 long tons; 53 short tons)
- Electric system/s: Catenary; 10 kV 16 2/3 Hz AC, 15 kV 16 2/3 Hz AC
- Current pickup: Pantograph
- Traction motors: 4
Performance figures
- Maximum speed: 45 km/h (28 mph)
- Power output: 368 kW (493 hp)
Career
- Operators: Norsk Transport; Norwegian State Railways
- Numbers: RjB.1–3, 6–8; NSB 7 2501 - 7 2502
- Locale: Rjukanbanen
- Retired: 1956
- Current owner: Norwegian Railway Museum

NSB El 7 was a series electric locomotives delivered between 1911 and 1918 to Norsk Transport that operated the Rjukan Line and the Tinnoset Line, where they were designated RjB.1, 2, 3, 6, 7 and 8. The locomotives were built by AEG (motor) and Skabo (chassis).

The first three locomotives were delivered to the Rjukan Line along with two smaller units, RjB 4 and 5 (which were given the designation El 6 by NSB). El 7 is exactly two El 6; it has two transformers, four motors instead of two, Bo'Bo' instead of Bo axle arrangement, two pantographs, the same speed, and could haul twice the load. The locomotives cost NOK 52,090 in 1911.

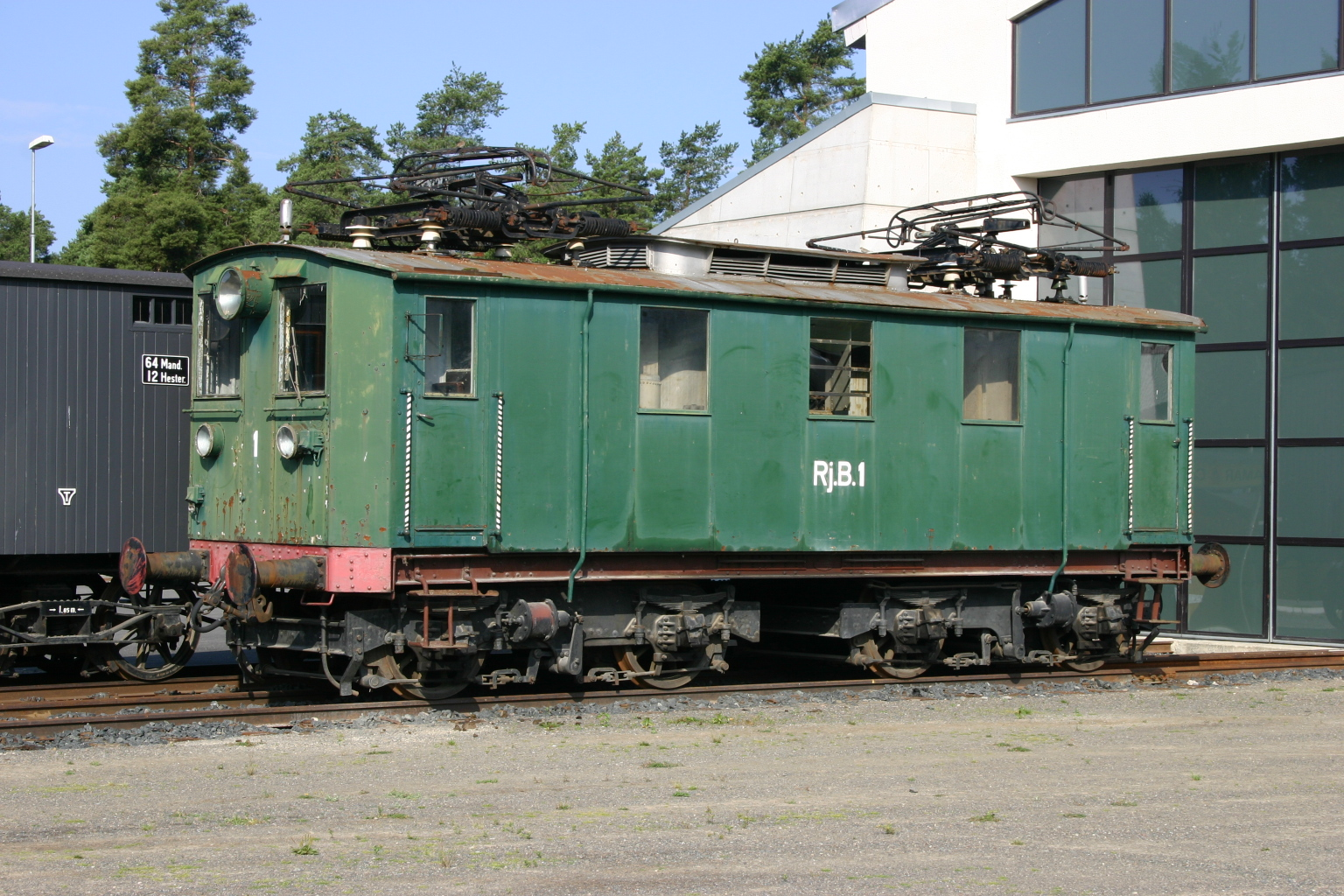
The preserved 7.2501

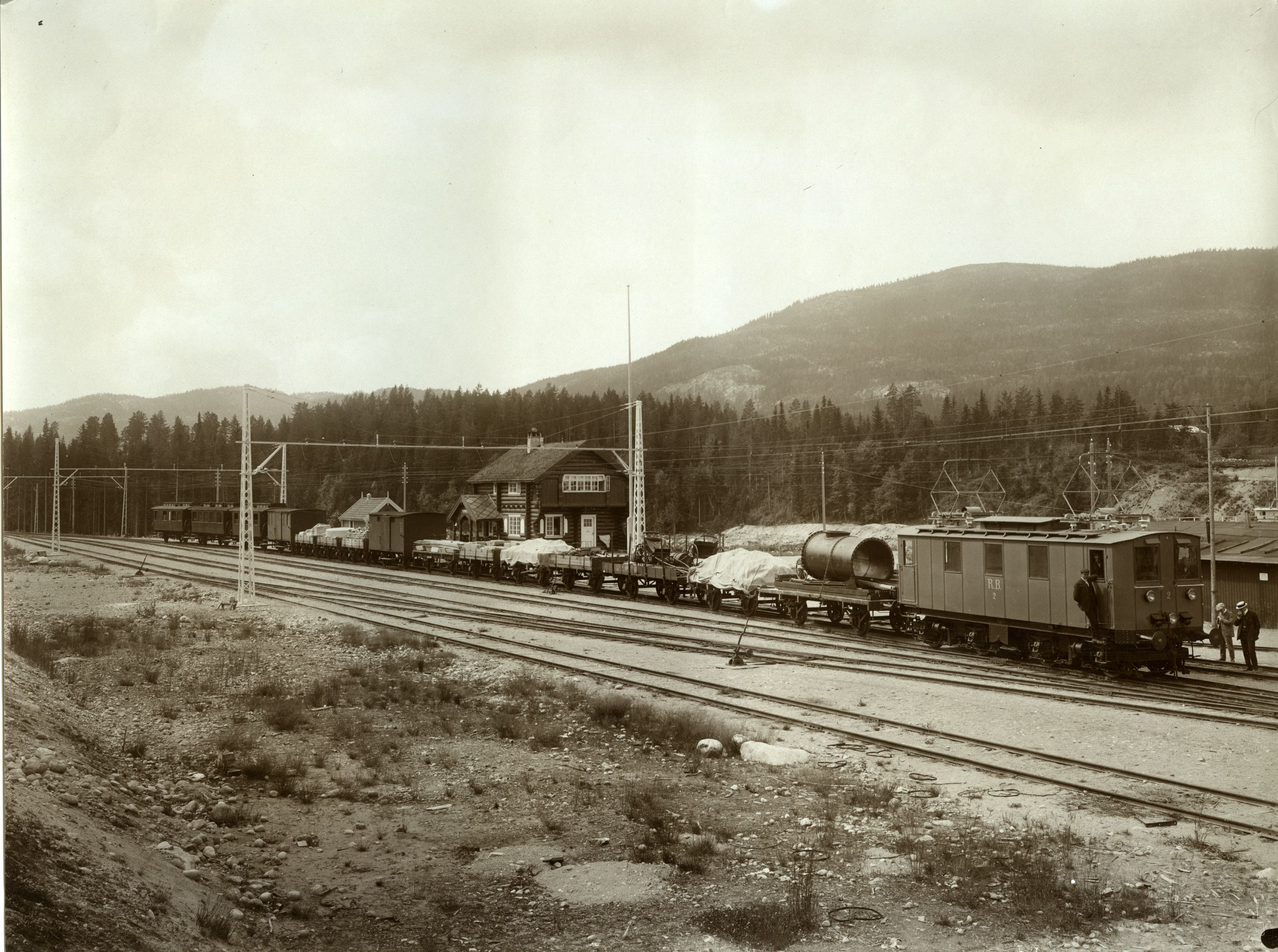
El 7-hauled train at Tinnoset Station in 1911

When two of the locos (no. 1 and 3) were transferred to Norwegian State Railways in 1920 after NSB took over the Tinnoset Line, where they were designated El 7 and numbered 2501 and 2502. Number 1 was sold back to Norsk Transport in 1932 while number 3 was transferred to Narvik in 1927 after it had been converted from 10 to 15 kV. It returned to Drammen in 1936 and remained there until it was taken out of service in 1956; RjB 6 was retired in 1960, the rest remained in service with Norsk Transport in 1966 when they were replaced with NSB El 1 (given numbers 14 and 15). No. 2501 is retained at the Norwegian Railway Museum.
