= Hydro Transport =

Norwegian railway and ferry company

Hydro Transport AS
- Formerly: Norsk Transportaktieselskab (1907–1973)
- Type: Subsidiary
- Industry: Transport
- Founded: 13 April 1907
- Defunct: 14 December 2009
- Fate: Closed
- Headquarters: Tinn Municipality, Norway
- Parent: Norsk Hydro

Hydro Transport AS was a railway- and shipping company responsible for the transport of chemicals from Norsk Hydro Rjukan. A subsidiary of Norsk Hydro, the company was founded in 1907, operations ceased in 1991, while the company became defunct at the end of 2009.

To transport the products to the coastal port at Skien, Norsk Hydro needed to build an extensive railway network. Cargo was stored in tank cars and transported down the 16-kilometre (10 mi) Rjukanbanen to Mæl, where it was transferred to the Tinnsjø railway ferry. After a 30-kilometre (19 mi) ride across the lake, it was again transferred to Tinnoset Line and transported 34 kilometres (21 mi) to Notodden where it was transshipped to barges and transported down the Telemark Canal. After 1919 the final stage was replaced with the 74-kilometre (46 mi) Bratsberg Line; simultaneously the Tinnoset Line was nationalized and taken over by Norges Statsbaner.

== History ==
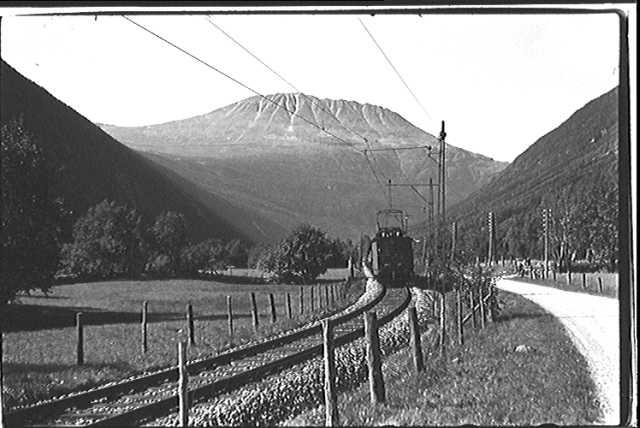
Locomotive hauling train down Vestfjorddalen

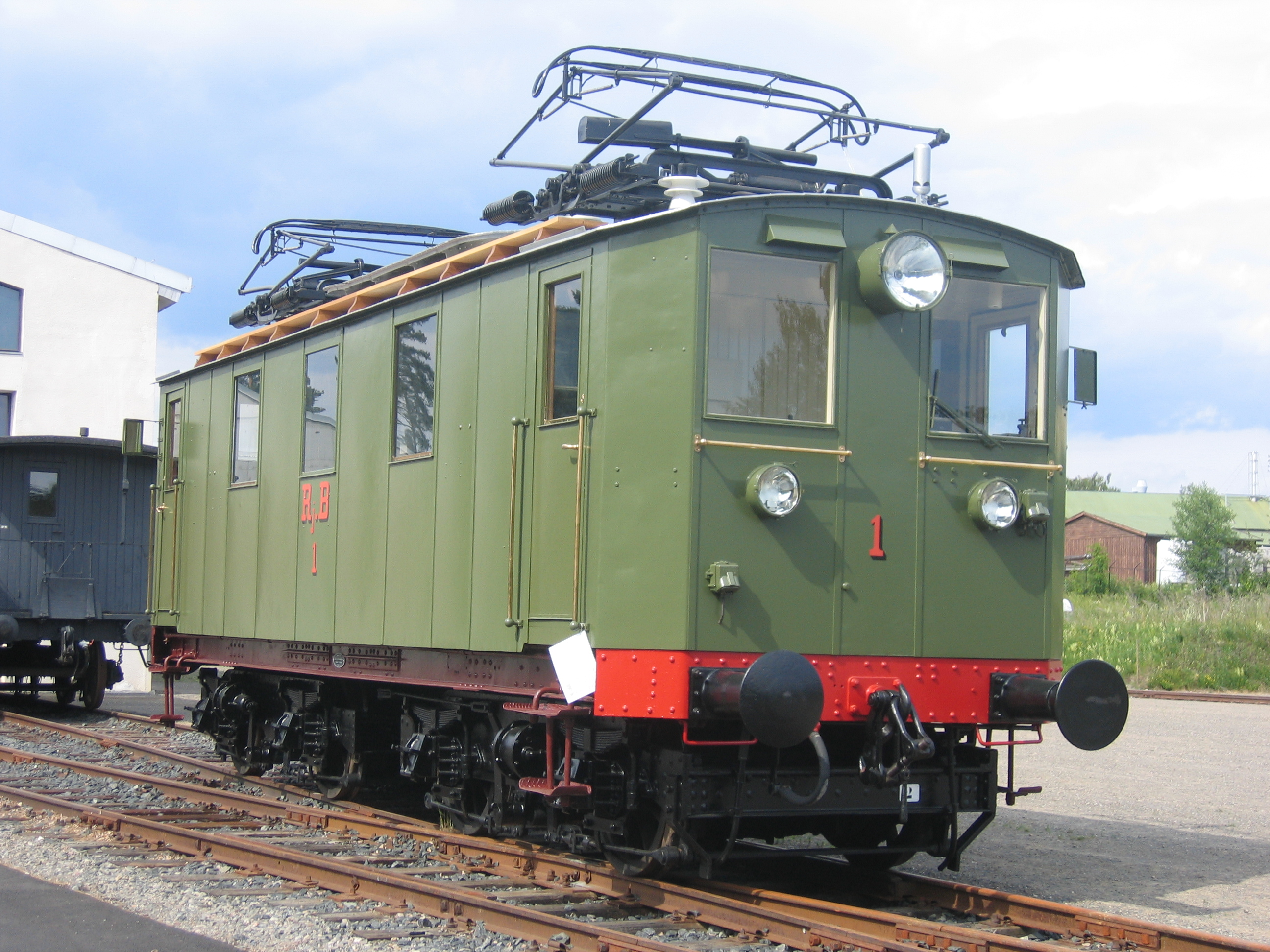
RjB 1 at the Norwegian Railway Museum

Founded as Norsk Transportaktieselskab (often modernised as Norsk Transport AS) on 13 April 1907 at the same time as Rjukan Salpeterfabrik, the company was a 50/50 joint venture between Norsk Hydro-Elektrisk Kvælstofaktieselskab (today Norsk Hydro) and Badische Anilin- und Soda-Fabrik (today BASF). It received a thirty-year concession on 17 July 1907 to build—with necessary expropriations—and operate a railway from Rjukan to Notodden.

On 31 May 1913 Norsk Transport and Norges Statsbaner (NSB) agreed to build the Bratsberg Line, which would extend the Tinnoset Line from Notodden to the coastal port. The agreement meant the railway line would become a joint venture between the two, while operations south of Tinnoset would be performed by NSB. Norsk Transport would remain the owner and operator of Rjukanbanen and the ferries. Norsk Hydro was forced to subsidize both the Tinnoset Line and the Bratsberg Line, and on 1 July 1953 Norsk Transport sold their stake to NSB.

As part of the concession Norsk Transport was to provide passenger transport from Rjukan to Notodden. Passenger wagons were hooked to freight trains, and ran from Rjukan to Mæl, with intermediate stops; at Mæl passengers would board the railway ferries. From Tinnoset a corresponding train would transport them to Notodden, and after the Bratsberg Line opened, connections were available to Skien and Oslo Vestbanestasjon. Services from Tinnoset were the responsibility of NSB after 1913, but before that Norsk Transport provided passenger transport all the way to Notodden.

After the end of the war Norsk Hydro had a strong liquidity, while the green revolution and increased industrialization of agriculture in Europe boomed the demand for the products; from 1945 to 1955 production increased eightfold. The increased transport was a heavy burden on the two steamships, and in 1953 Norsk Transport ordered MF Storegut, a diesel powered ship of 1119 gross register tons. She was launched on 25 May 1956 and the two older ferries were put to reserve duty in the meantime. A number of upgrades were made to the line, and the two locomotives 9 and 10 were bought in 1958. This was followed by the three diesel locomotives 20, 21 and 22 from Henschel. In 1966 two NSB El 1 locomotives were bough, and the voltage on the line increased from 10 to 15 kV.

In 1957 five round trips had to be made each day, while the trains made nine round trips from Rjukan to Mæl. Rjukan station handled 100 wagons, with 800 tonnes potassium nitrate and 400 tonnes ammonia; 723,482 tonnes were transported on Rjukanbanen by 1962, 14% of the transported amount of NSB (excluding the ore trains on Ofotbanen). In total 30 million tonnes on 1,5 million carloads were transported from 1911 to 1991.

During the 1960s a series of cost reductions were introduced on the line, after major reorganizations between 1965 and 1970; the last commuter train for the workers to the plants went on 25 May 1968, while on 31 May 1970 the last passenger train in connection with the ferries went on Rjukanbanen, being replaced with bus. In 1972 Norsk Transport applied to terminate passenger transport with the railway ferry, since they were operating trips with only passengers and no cargo. The application was declined by the Norwegian Ministry of Transport and Communications, but in 1978 they permitted that the Saturday afternoon and Sunday departures be terminated—these were not used to transport freight trains. By the mid eighties passenger numbers had fallen dramatically, and in 1985 the department gave in and permitted the termination of passenger services with Storegut and Ammonia.

The plan had been producing a deficit since 1982. Norsk Hydro made an agreement with the authorities where they would create 350 new permanent jobs, create a business fund and donate NOK 60 million for the construction of a new road, Route 37 along Lake Tinn. In 1988 Norsk Hydro terminated the ammonia production, and in 1991 they also closed down the production ammonium nitrate and potassium nitrate, along with Rjukanbanen. Within a few years the number of Norsk Hydro employees in Rjukan had been reduced from 1,760 to 530 people; 24 of these were employed by Norsk Transport operating the railway and railway ferries. All the employees were either retired or moved to other areas of Norsk Hydro's enterprise.

The last train ran on 4 July 1991, four days after the plant closed. Without production at the plants there was no need for the railway; it would be more economical to transport the few last products by truck. The final hauled several wagons down to the coast for scrapping. The closing of the Rjukan Line also terminated operations on the Tinnoset Line, where passenger traffic had remained until 1991.

== Line ==
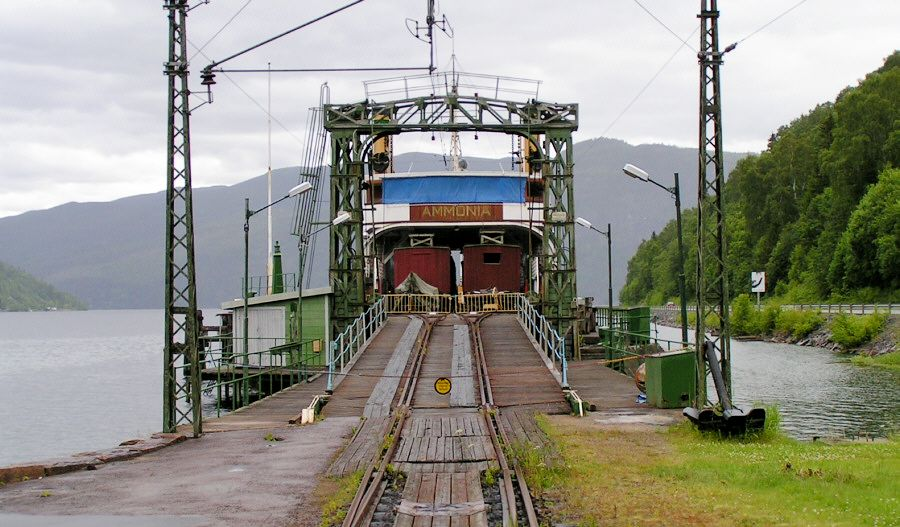
The railway ferry SF Ammonia at Mæl

=== Rjukan Line ===
The Rjukan Line is a 16-kilometre (10 mi) line from Rjukan to Mæl, where the wagons were transshipped to ferries.

=== Ferries ===
Norsk Transport had four ferries that transported the wagons 30 kilometres (19 mi) down Lake Tinn from Mæl to Tinnoset. From 1907 an unmotorized barge named Tinnsjø was completed; the steam ship Skarsfos was used to haul it between the two railways. The first self-propelled ferry was SF Rjukanfos, a 338 GRT ferry launched in 1909. She got a major overhaul in 1915 after the sister ship SF Hydro at 494 GRT was launched the same year. The third steamship was SF Ammonia at 929 GRT. Lake Tinn freezes in winter, and all the ships had to be built as icebreakers. Until 1936 Norsk Transport had to compete with a passenger steamship service, but after their closing the railway ferries were responsible for all passenger traffic on the lake, which also helped boost passenger traffic on the trains. The increased transport after World War II was a heavy burden on the two steamships, and in 1953 Norsk Transport ordered MF Storegut, a diesel powered ship of 1,119 GRT. She was launched on 25 May 1956, and the two older ferries were put to reserve duty in the meantime.

=== Tinnoset Line ===
While built by Norsk Transport, from 1913 the Tinnoset Line was operated by NSB, and owned by Øst-Telemark Jernbaneaktieselskap. In addition to freight from Norsk Hydro, the Tinnoset Line was in part used for lumber transport, and it had passenger services until 31 December 1990 along the 34-kilometre (21 mi) long line.

=== Telemark Canal ===
The Telemark Canal was built in 1854–1861, and used by Norsk Transport to transport the chemicals from Notodden to Skien until the Bratsberg Line in 1919. Barges were used down the canal, and the cargo had to be transshipped before being exported. A suggestion to expand the canal to allow coastal vessels access was scrapped in favor of a railway.

=== Bratsberg Line ===
The Bratsberg Line runs 74 kilometres (46 mi) from Notodden to Eidanger, and the only line to remain operational after the closing of Norsk Hydro in Rjukan. The line connects Notodden with Grenland, including the cities of Skien and Porsgrunn and the ports at Herøya and Brevik. Prior to 1949 the terminal station had a break-of-gauge, and Vestfoldbanen continued as narrow gauge.

== Rolling stock ==
Locomotives
Road number	Traction	Builder	Built	Service	Wheels	Weight	Power	Speed	Fate
1	Steam	Sächsische Maschinenfabrik	1901	1907–08	B	12.7 t		30 km/h	Sold to Valdresbanen; dismantled 1935
2	Steam	Henschel & Sohn	1907	1907–08	B	14.3 t		40 km/h	Sold to Lorentzen & Wettre; dismantled in 1965; NSB class 37
3	Steam	A. Borsig	1908	1908–18	B	13.8 t		40 km/h	Sold to NSB; dismantled in 1957
4 "Odin"	Steam	Orenstein & Koppel	1908	1908–49	B	13 t			Dismantled in 1964
344 & 336	Steam	Baldwin Locomotive Works	1917	1918–65	C	24.7 t		40 km/h	Dismantled in 1969
1, 2, 3, 6, 7 & 8	Electric	AEG/Skabo	1911–18	1911–66	D	44 t	375 kW	45 km/h	NSB El 7
4 & 5	Electric	AEG/Skabo	1912	1912–56	B	23 t	190 kW	45 km/h	NSB El 6
9 & 10	Electric	Sécheron	1958	1958–91	Bo'Bo'	60 t	375 kW	55 km/h	
14 & 15	Electric	Per Kure/Thune	1922	1966–91	B'B'	61.3 t	720 kW	70 km/h	NSB El 1
20, 21 & 22	Diesel	Henschel-Werke	1961	1961–91	C	43.5 t	375 kW	60 km/h	
