= Rjukan Station =

Railway station in Tinn, Norway

Rjukan
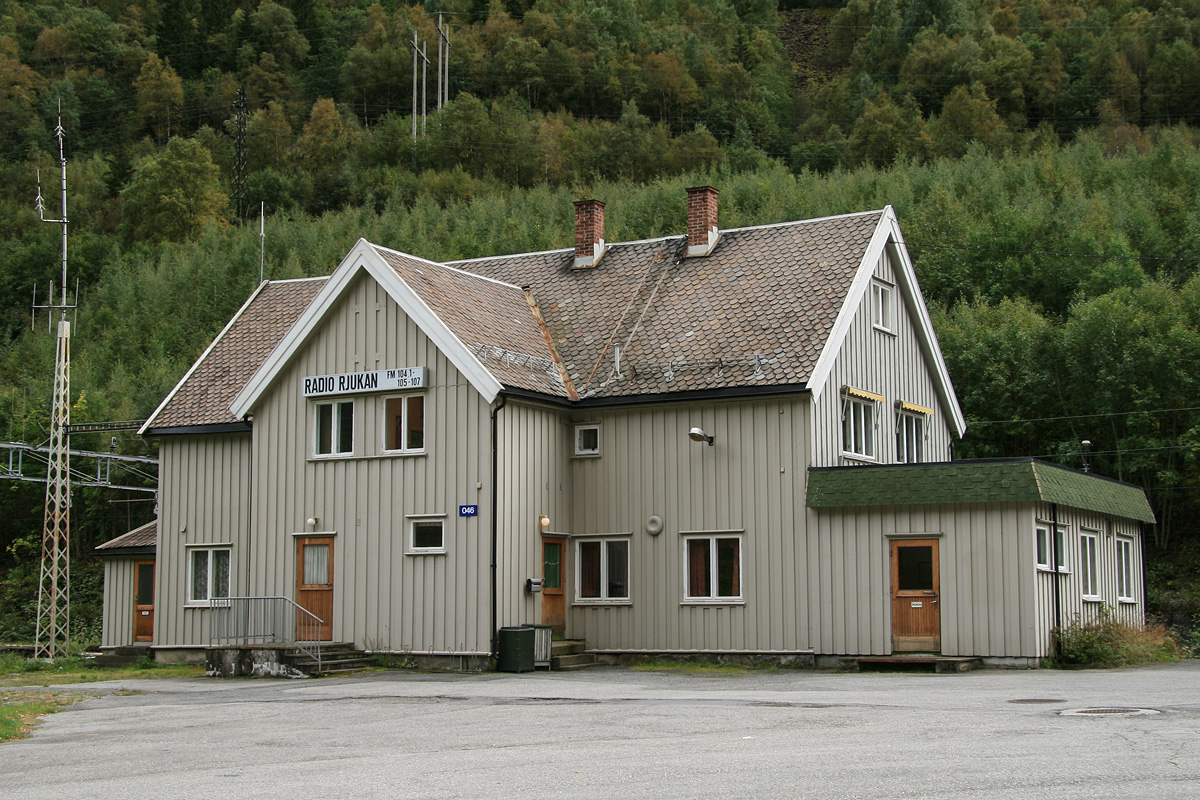

General information
- Location: Rjukan, Tinn Municipality; Norway
- Coordinates: 59°52′42″N 8°34′55″E
- Elevation: 301.1 m (988 ft)
- Owner: Norsk Transport
- Operator: Norsk Transport
- Line: Rjukan Line
- Distance: 15.95 km (9.91 mi)
- Platforms: 1

Construction
- Architect: Thorvald Astrup

History
- Opened: 9 August 1909
Location

Rjukan Station (Norwegian: Rjukan stasjon) is the terminal railway station of the Rjukan Line, located at Rjukan in Tinn Municipality, Norway.

The station opened as part of the railway on 9 August 1909 as Saaheim, until renaming to Rjukan on 15 November 1912. It was rebuilt 1959-60 and closed on 5 July 1991; after the closing the local radio station Radio Rjukan has moved into the building.
