= NSB Class 49 =

Locomotive of Norwegian state Railway

NSB Type 49
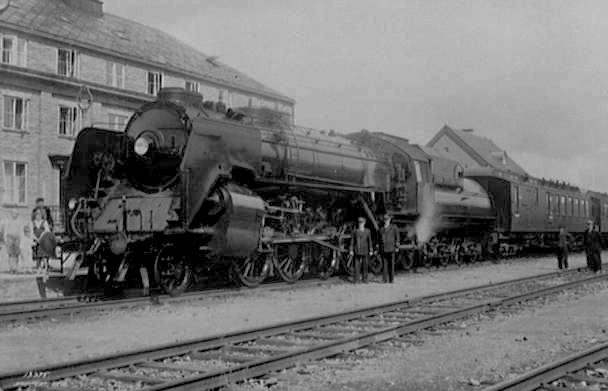
- Dovregubben at Oppdal station 1935
Type and origin
- Power type: Steam
- Builder: Hamar & Thune (3), Krupp, (2); Thune (2)
- Build date: 1935–1941
- Total produced: 7
Specifications
- Configuration
  - Whyte: 2-8-4
  - UIC: 1′D2′h4v
- Gauge: 1,435 mm (4 ft 8 1/2 in) standard gauge
- Driver dia.: 1,525 mm (60.04 in)
- Axle load: 17.5 t (17.2 long tons; 19.3 short tons)
- Adhesive weight: 62.4 t (61.4 long tons; 68.8 short tons)
- Loco weight: 87.2 t (85.8 long tons; 96.1 short tons)
- Tender weight: 17.4 t (17.1 long tons; 19.2 short tons)
- Fuel type: Coal
- Fuel capacity: 8.4 t (8.3 long tons; 9.3 short tons)
- Water cap.: 27.2 t (26.8 long tons; 30.0 short tons)
- Boiler pressure: 241.8 psi (17.00 kp/cm^{2}; 1,667 kPa)
- Heating surface: 256 m^{2} (2,760 sq ft)
- Superheater
  - Heating area: 102 m^{2} (1,100 sq ft)
- High-pressure cylinder: 465 mm × 650 mm (18.31 in × 25.59 in)
- Low-pressure cylinder: 720 mm × 700 mm (28.35 in × 27.56 in)
Performance figures
- Maximum speed: 90 km/h (56 mph)
- Power output: 2,600 bhp (1,900 kW)
- Tractive effort: 468kN
Career
- Operators: NSB
- Class: Type 49
- Number in class: 7
- Numbers: 463, 464, 465, 470, 471, 472 and 473
- Nicknames: Dovregubber
- Retired: 1958
- Preserved: No 470

The NSB Class 49, nicknamed Dovregubben ("the Dovre Giant"), locomotives were 2-8-4 steam locomotives used to pull heavy trains on the Dovre Line. It is the largest type of steam locomotive in the history of the Norwegian State Railways.

The engines came in three series, the 49a, 49b and 49c. Between 1935 and 1941 five engines were produced by Hamar & Thune, two by Krupp AG. In addition to the seven engines delivered, there were seven engines which were destroyed by a bombing raid during World War II while under construction in Germany, another four were under construction at Thune but were never completed. The engines were retired from service during 1957, stored and finally written off on December 16, 1958, due to dieselization of the Dovre Line.

The numbers of the Dovregubben locomotives were 463, 464, 465, 470, 471, 472 and 473. Engine no. 470 is on display at the Norwegian Railway Museum in Hamar.

== Specifications ==
- Length:
  - a-series: 22.0 m (72 ft 2 1/8 in)
  - b-series: 22.0 m (72 ft 2 1/8 in)
  - c-series: 22.3 m (73 ft 2 in)
- Weight of engine:
  - a-series: 87.2 t (85.8 long tons; 96.1 short tons)
  - b-series: 92.7 t (91.2 long tons; 102.2 short tons)
  - c-series: 88.6 t (87.2 long tons; 97.7 short tons)
- Weight of tender:
  - a-series: 17.4 t (17.1 long tons; 19.2 short tons)
  - b-series: 17.4 t (17.1 long tons; 19.2 short tons)
  - c-series: 18.4 t (18.1 long tons; 20.3 short tons)

== See also ==
- 2-8-4-engines of Norway
