= NSB El 2 =

Class of Norwegian electric locomotives

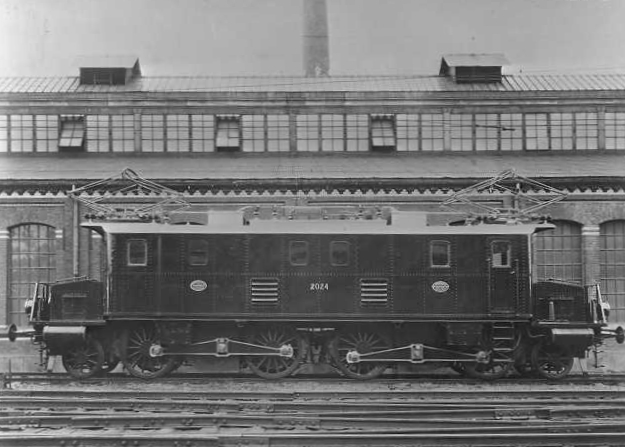
Type and origin
- Power type: Electric
- Builder: Norsk Elektrisk & Brown Boveri; Thune
- Build date: 1923
- Total produced: 2
Specifications
- Configuration
  - AAR: 1B+B1
  - UIC: 1B'+B'1
- Gauge: 1,435 mm (4 ft 8 1/2 in)
- Length: 12.7 m (41 ft 8 in)
- Loco weight: 77.5 t (76.3 long tons; 85.4 short tons)
- Electric system/s: 15 kV 16 2/3 Hz AC Catenary
- Current pickup: Pantograph
Performance figures
- Maximum speed: 75 km/h (47 mph)
- Power output: 857 kW (1,149 hp)
Career
- Operators: Norwegian State Railways
- Numbers: 2 2023 - 2 2024
- Locale: Norway
- Retired: 1967

NSB El 2 was a series of two electric locomotives built by Norsk Elektrisk & Brown Boveri and Thune for the Norwegian State Railways in 1923. They remained in service until 1967. Neither has been preserved.
