= Bohus (retailer) =

Norwegian furniture retailer

- Industry: Furniture retail
- Founded: 1976
- Headquarters: Oslo, Norway
- Number of locations: 60
- Area served: Norway
- Products: Furniture
- Website: www.bohus.no

Bohus are a furniture retailer in Norway.

It was founded in 1976 under the name Samarbeidende Møbelhandlere ('Cooperating Furniture Retailers'). The current name is a pun using the words bo and hus, Norwegian for "live" and "house" respectively, inspired by the famous German art school Bauhaus. The name is also shared by a Swedish fortress, on Norwegian land until the Treaty of Roskilde in 1658.

The chain operates 60 stores. The administrative headquarters are at Økern, Oslo.

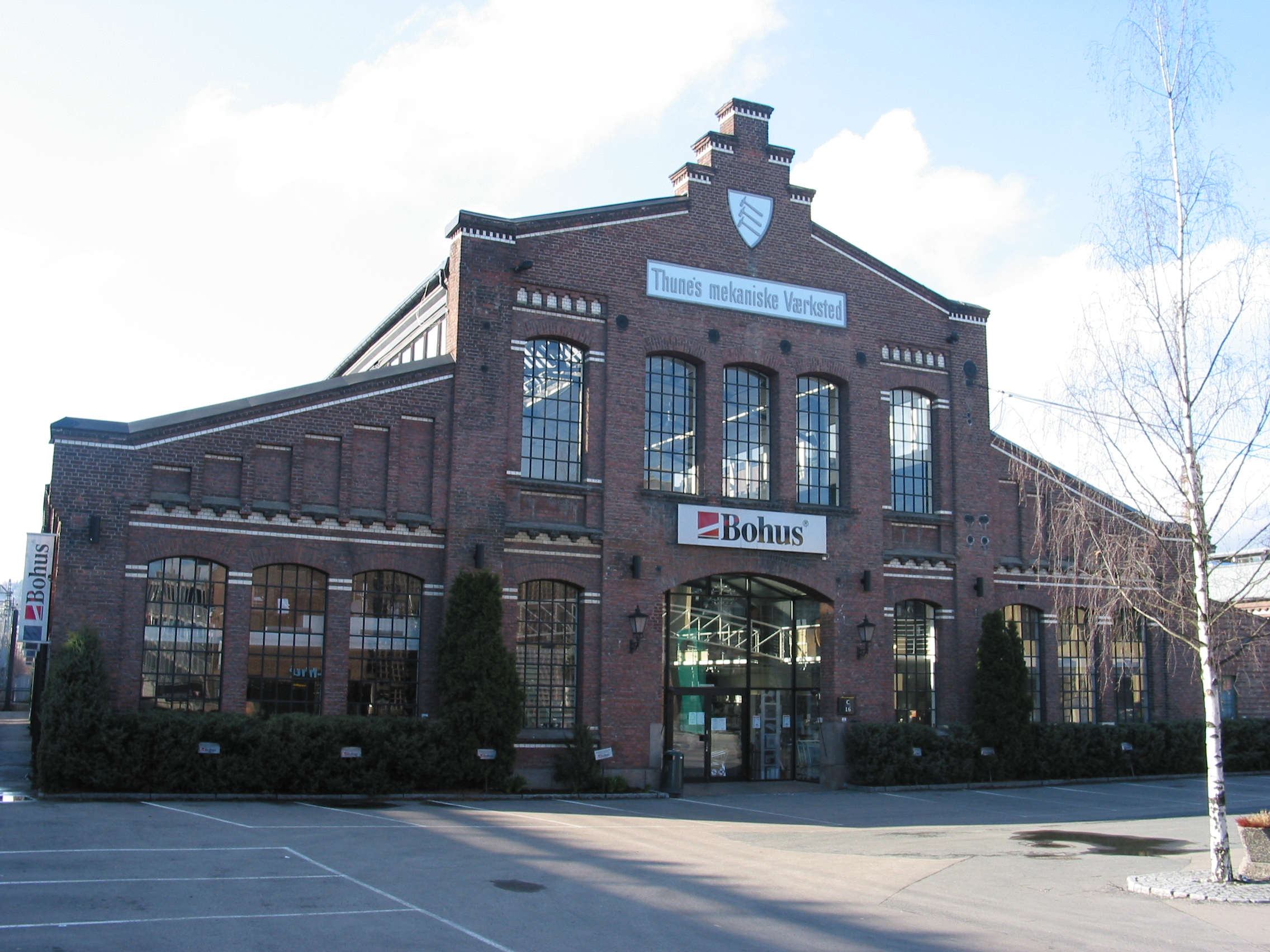
An outlet in a former factory (Thune).
