= NSB El 1 =

Class of Norwegian electric locomotives

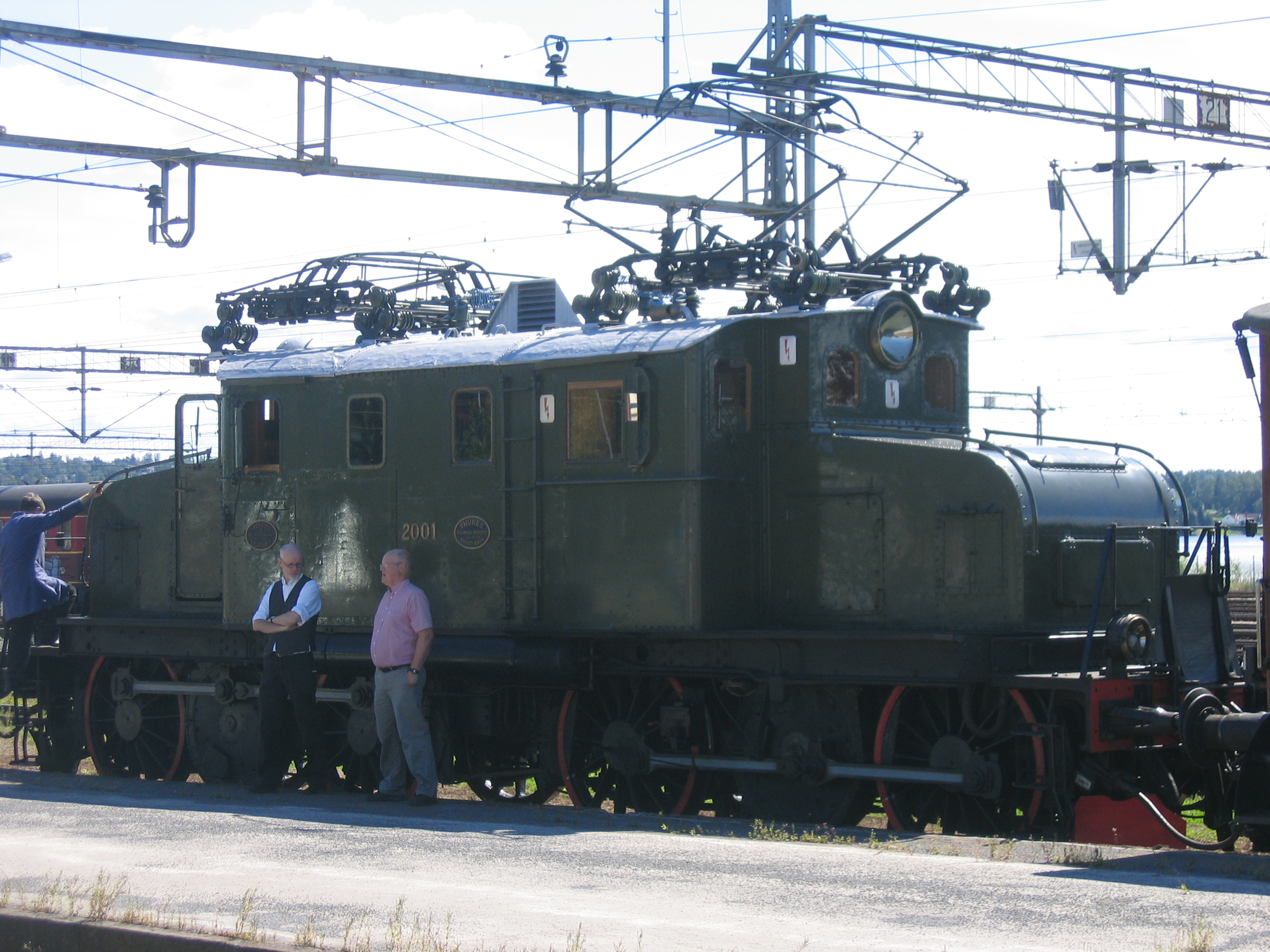
- NSB El 1 2001
Type and origin
- Power type: Electric
- Builder: ASEA; Thune
- Build date: 1922–1930
- Total produced: 24
Specifications
- Configuration
  - AAR: B-B
  - UIC: B'B'
- Gauge: 1,435 mm (4 ft 8 1/2 in) standard gauge
- Length: 12.7 m (41 ft 8 in)
- Loco weight: 61.3 t (60.3 long tons; 67.6 short tons)
- Electric system/s: 15 kV 16 2/3 Hz AC Catenary
- Current pickup: Pantograph
Performance figures
- Maximum speed: 70 km/h (43 mph)
- Power output: 690 kW (930 hp)
- Tractive effort: 157 kN (35,000 lbf)
Career
- Operators: Norwegian State Railways
- Numbers: 2 2023 – 2 2024
- Locale: Norway
- Retired: 1973

NSB El 1 is the first electric locomotive series used by the Norwegian State Railways, from 1922 until 1973. Twenty-four engines were delivered from ASEA and Thune, twenty-two in 1922 and two in 1930. Based on the German DB E 71 and Swedish SJ Oc it has two two-axle bogie with one motor in each.

== History ==
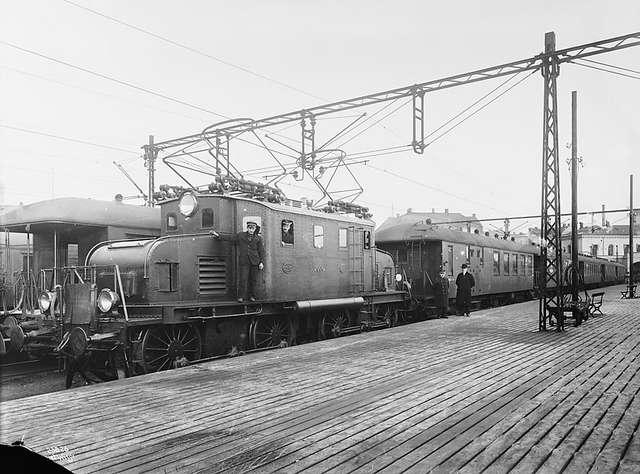
Brand new El 1 at Oslo West Station in 1922

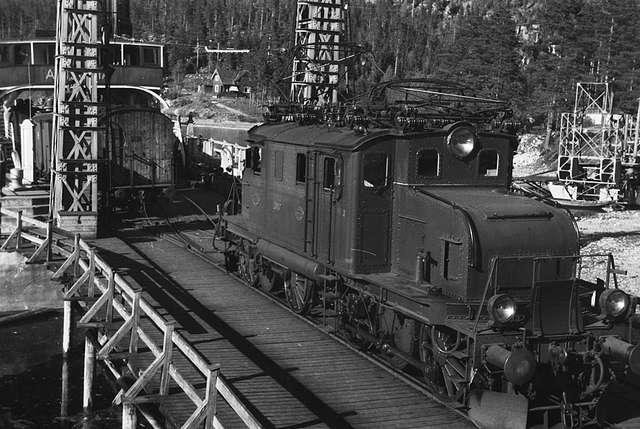
El 1 loading SF Ammonia on the Rjukan Line in the 1940s

When the Drammen Line from Oslo West Station to Brakerøya was electrified as the first NSB line in 1922, NSB was in need of electric traction. The engines were used both for passenger- and freight trains. At first it was used on the Drammen Line, then on Sørlandet Line. In 1966 two of the locos, no. 2001 and 2002, were sold to the Rjukan Line where they served until 1988. Two of the locomotives have been preserved (no. 2001 and 2011).
