= Thune (company) =

Defunct Norwegian manufacturing company

Thunes Mekaniske Værksted A/S
- Company type: Public
- Industry: Heavy industry
- Founded: Drammen, Norway (1815, see text)
- Founder: Anders Paulsen Thune
- Fate: Merged
- Successor: Thune-Eureka (later: Kværner Eureka)
- Headquarters: Oslo, Norway
- Products: Locomotives

Thunes Mekaniske Værksted A/S, Thune for short, was a Norwegian manufacturing company that among other things built locomotives. The production facilities were last located at Skøyen.

== History ==
Thune traced its roots to a workshop founded by Anders Paulsen Thune in 1815 in Drammen. Anders Paulsen Thune was a blacksmith by profession. His son took over the enterprise, and in 1851 they moved to Christiania. By 1870 the production facilities were located in the street Ruseløkkveien. In 1871 Andreas Lauritz Thune, grandson of the founder, took over. The facilities were almost immediately moved to the nearby street Munkedamsveien. He started production of agricultural machinery and steam engines. Locomotive production began in the 1890s.

Eventually, the locale in Munkedamsveien became too small for large-scale industrial production. Located in the centre of the city, it was difficult to expand. Instead, Thune bought the property Kjellebekk at Skøyen in Aker, a more rural municipality that surrounded Kristiania. In addition, Skøyen was served by a railway station. Thune moved to Skøyen in 1901, and all activity in Munkedamsveien was ceased by 1903. After moving to Skøyen, production of turbines was started.

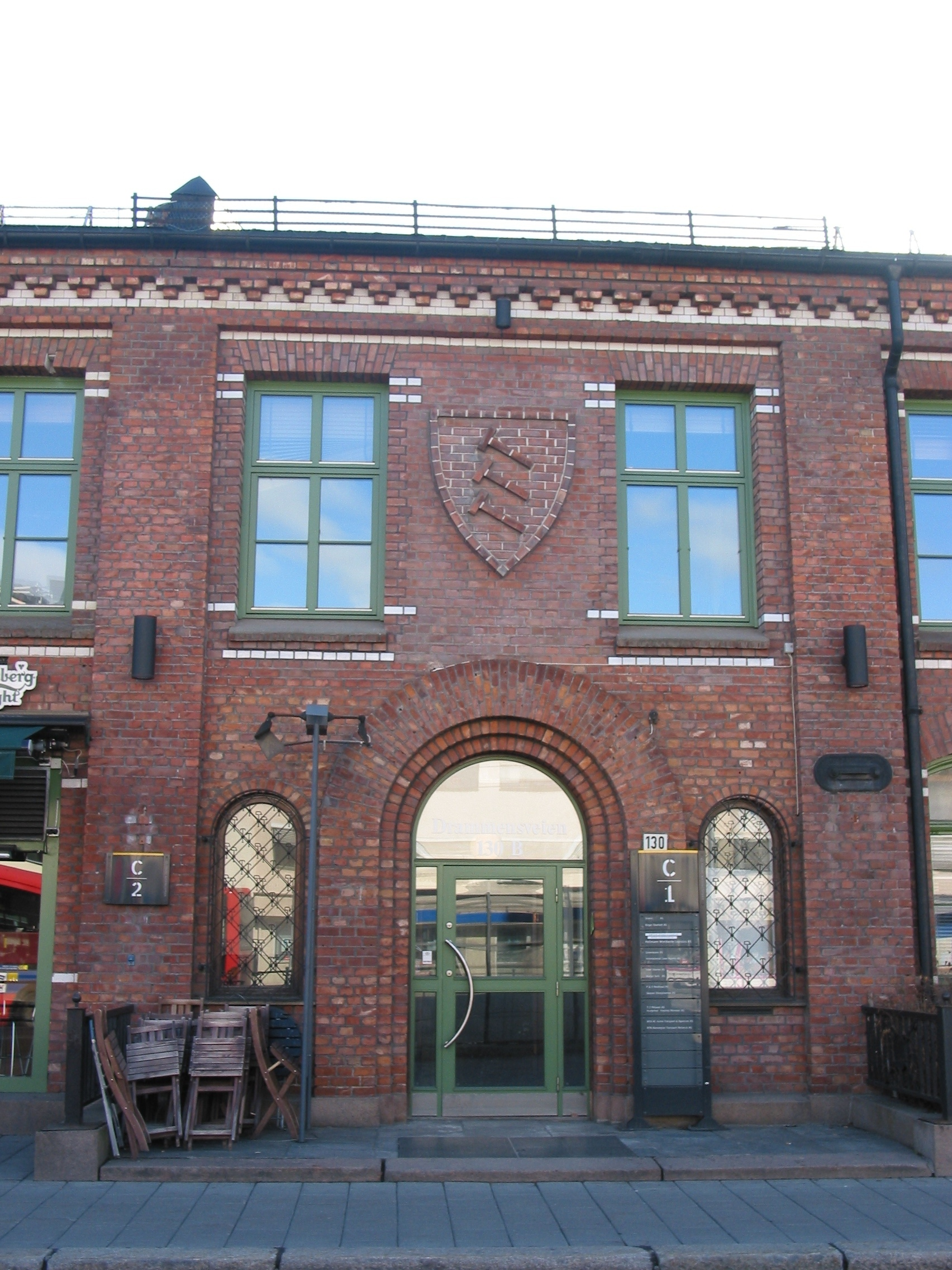
Part of the old production facility, with the Thune logo embedded.

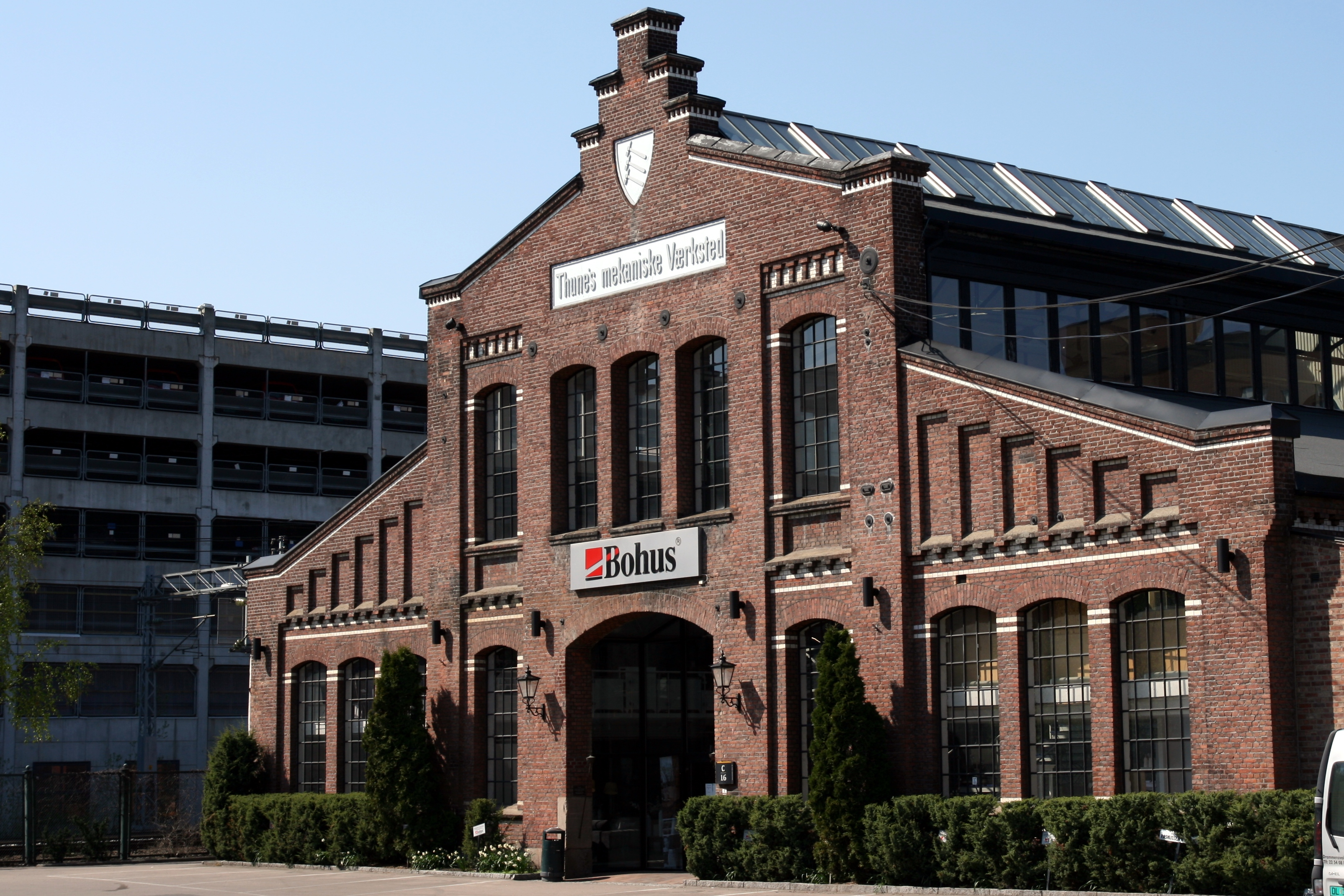
Part of the old production facility, now housing a Bohus retail store.

Around the turn of the century Thune had become the most important locomotive manufacturer in Norway, along with Hamar Jernstøberi og Mekaniske Verksted. Between 1901 and 1920 these two manufacturers delivered about 250 locomotives to the Norwegian State Railways. Locomotives built for the Norwegian State Railways (alone or in partnership) included NSB Di 2, NSB El 1, NSB El 2, NSB El 3, NSB El 4, NSB El 5, NSB El 8, NSB El 11 and NSB El 13. In 1935 it built the NSB Class 49 locomotive, nicknamed Dovregubben, together with Hamar Jernstøberi. Thune and Hamar delivered five engines between 1935 and 1941. However, with the hardships of World War II, the production of the Class 49 was stalled. Four engines under construction at Thune were never completed. Thune was acquired by the owners of Kværner Brug.

Thune resumed activity after the war, peaking at a number of about six hundred laborers during the 1950s. However, in 1969 the company was merged with Eureka Mekaniske Værksted to form Thune-Eureka. It relocated to Tranby in 1976. The Thune name ultimately disappeared as Thune-Eureka was acquired by the Kværner corporation, continuing under the name Kværner Eureka. The old production facilities have been rebuilt to house shops, offices and restaurants. Locally, the area is still known as Thune, the name lent to the Oslo Tramway station east of Skøyen.

After Kværner’s split in the early 2000s the name Thune Eureka was acquired by a series of Spain-based Kværner employees. Today Thune Eureka still operates true to its Norwegian origins and to its manufacturing essence.
