= Norsk Hydro Rjukan =

Norsk Hydro's production facilities at Rjukan, Tinn

Coordinates: 59.871116°N 8.491351°E

- Type: Subsidiary
- Founded: 13 April 1907
- Defunct: 1 July 1991
- Fate: Closed
- Headquarters: Rjukan, Norway
- Products: Fertilizer
- Number of employees: 1,760
- Parent: Norsk Hydro

Norsk Hydro Rjukan is an industrial facility operated by Norsk Hydro at Rjukan in Tinn Municipality, Norway, from 1911 to 1991. The plant manufactured chemicals related to the production of fertilizer, initially potassium nitrate from arc-produced nitric acid and later ammonia, hydrogen, and heavy water. The location was chosen for its vicinity to hydroelectric power plants built in the Måna river.

30 million tonnes of products, equivalent of 1.5 million wagon loads, were produced in Rjukan. After the closing, parts of the plants and the railway have been preserved.

== History ==
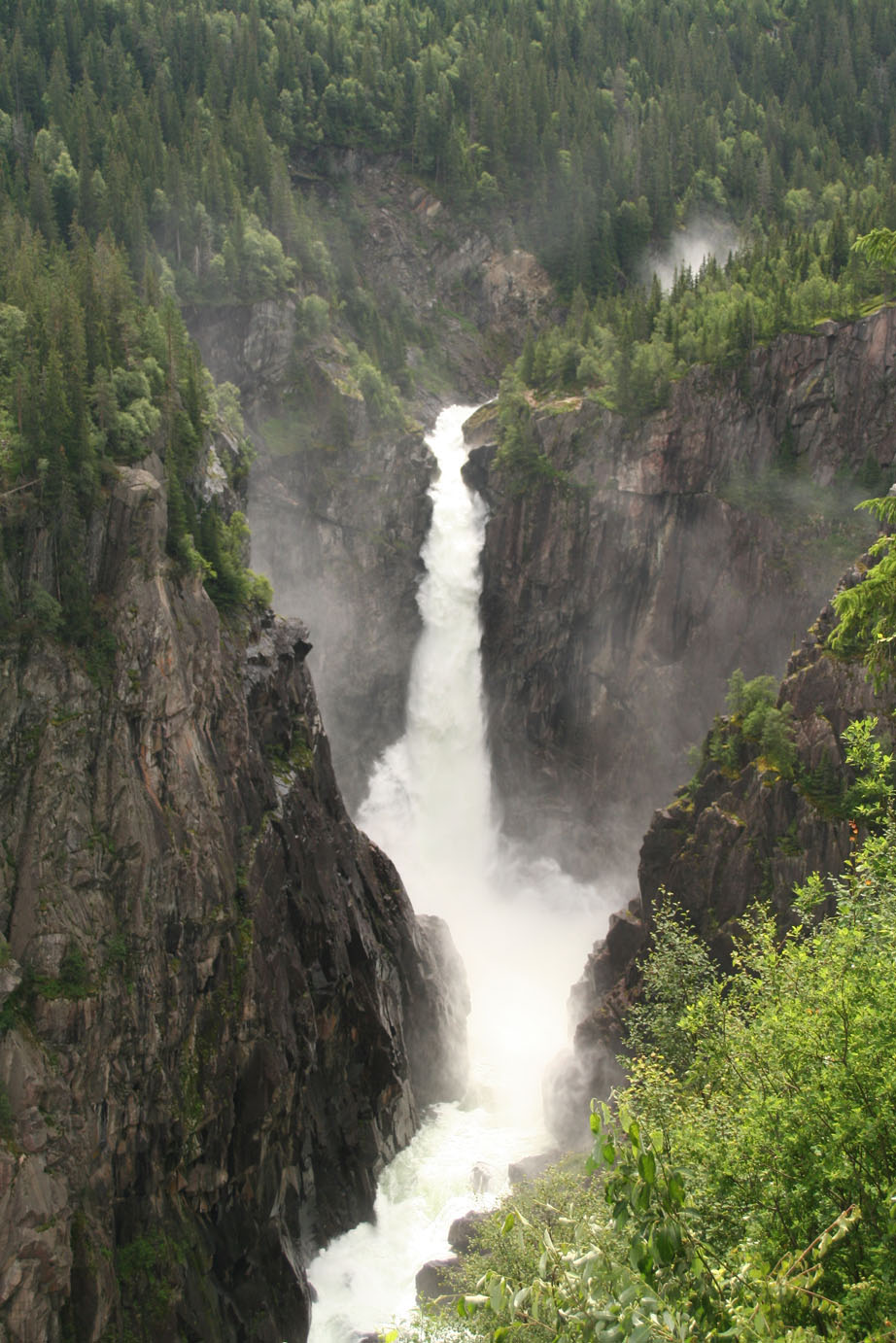
Rjukan Falls, from which the power stems

=== Background ===
The Telemark power-based industry adventure started in 1902 when Sam Eyde, along with Norwegian and Swedish investors, bought Rjukan Falls—establishing A/S Rjukanfos on 30 April 1903. The same year, on 13 February, Eyde and Kristian Birkeland had met and started working on refining the electric arc to produce an electric flame; allowing Eyde to complete his process of converting air and electricity into fertilizer. On 19 December 1903 Det Norske Kvælstofkompagni was founded, followed by Det Norske Aktieselskap for Eletrokemisk Industri (today Elkem) in 1904; both were in part owned by the Wallenberg family, Stockholms Enskilda Bank and Banque de Paris et des Pays-Bas.

The test plant for the Birkeland–Eyde process in Notodden started operation on 2 May 1905 as the first in the world to produce synthetic potassium nitrate. On 2 December 1905 Norsk Hydro-Elektrisk Kvælstofaktieselskab (now Norsk Hydro) was founded, and plans to start a new plant in Rjukan were initialized; moving closer to the source of power would improve efficiency and not make it possible for the newly independent Government of Norway to hinder construction of hydroelectric power by foreign investors—a major political issue at the time. Rjukanfos applied for permission to build a power line from Rjukan to Notodden, but on 18 June 1907 the Norwegian Parliament did not accept the application—despite an offer from Eyde that the state would receive escheat after eighty years—in part because the state would have to guarantee NOK 18 million for the project.

=== Construction ===
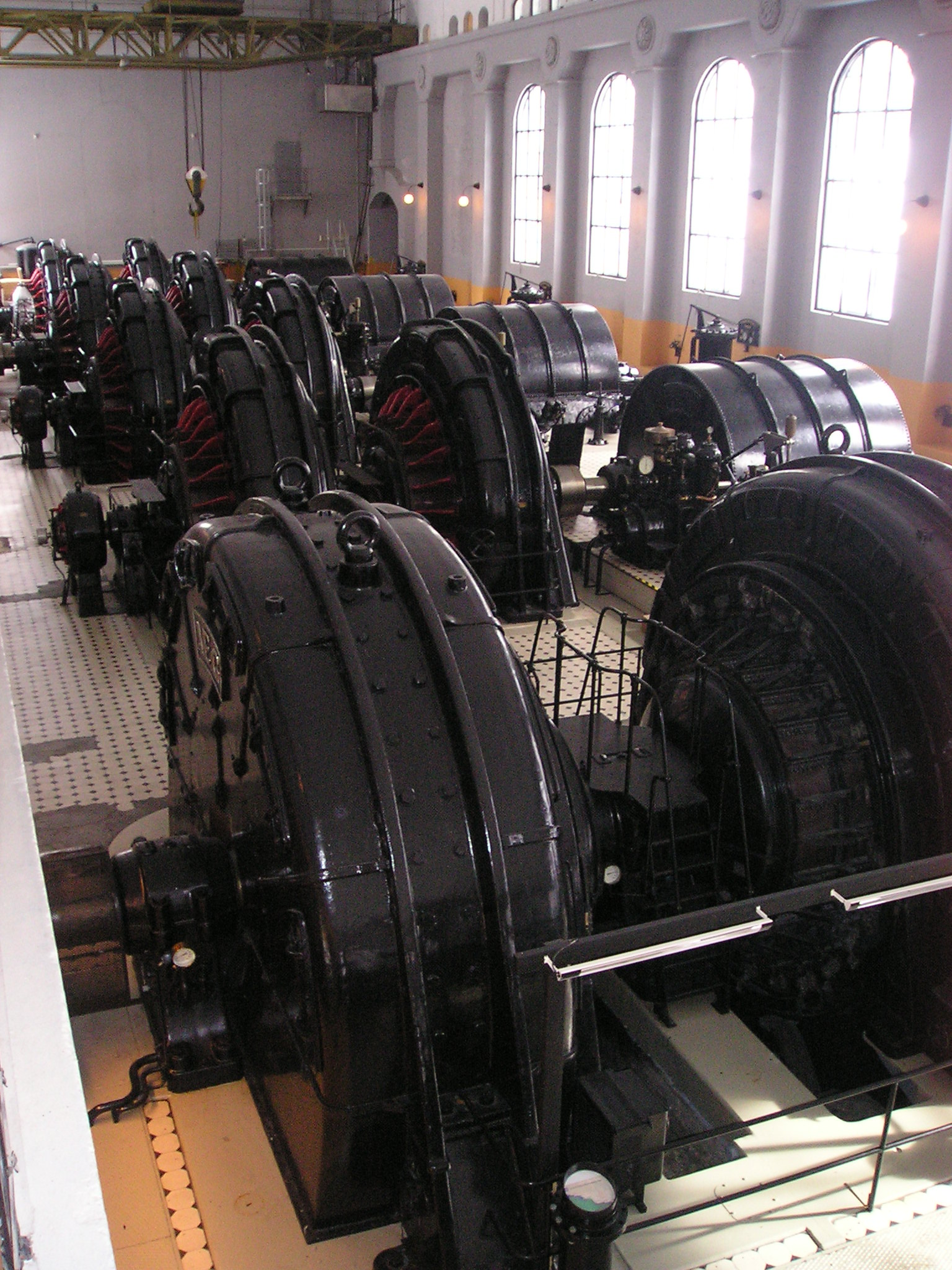
Turbines in the Vemork power station

On 13 April 1907 Norsk Hydro and the German group Badische Anilin- und Soda-Fabrik (today BASF) made an agreement for the creation of the factory at Rjukan, Rjukan Salpeterfabrik, and at the same time created Norsk Transportaktieselskap—both companies were owned as 50/50 joint ventures. Norsk Transport received concession on 17 July 1907 to build and operate a railway for thirty years. The companies had a stock equity of NOK 34 million.

Construction of the plants at Rjukan would commence through two states; first at Vemork and second at Såheim, while the town of Rjukan would be built in the middle. The initial plant would use both the Birkeland–Eyde furnace, and the Schönherr furnace; 120 were built on 6,000 square meters floorspace. On 28 September 1911 BASF sold their ownership in the Rjukan plants to Norsk Hydro, the same year the first plant opened.

Accompanying the plants was housing and public facilities for the workers. Norsk Hydro employed at the most 2,500 people during construction, and many settled and took industrial jobs after the plants were finished. The main engineer for the constructions at Rjukan was Sigurd Kloumann, while the main architect was Thorvald Astrup.

=== The first years ===
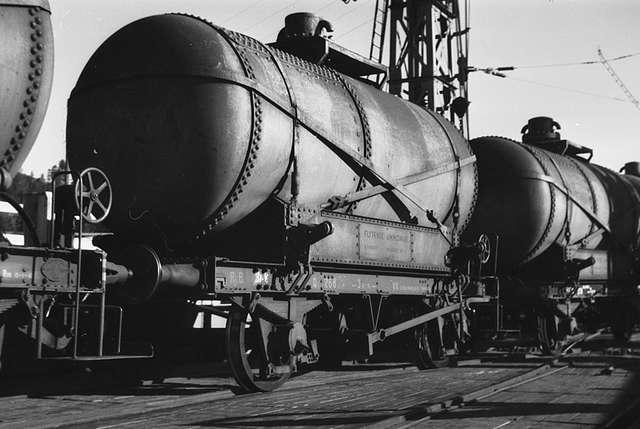
Tank cars with chemicals

The first potassium nitrate was shipped out on 8 December 1911, and two years later the plants were making a profit. Production increased from 110,000 tonnes per year to 250,000 tonnes in 1915, after the plant had been expanded, and up to 345,000 tonnes in 1917. The small hamlet of Rjukan had turned into a town, and in 1920 there were 11,651 people in Tinn.

The 1920s were a tough time, and production decreased, but in 1929 the electric arc technology was replaced by the Haber process, with the intermediate ammonia being synthesized at Vemork and transported by rail and ferry to Herøya outside Porsgrunn on the coast, where limestone easily could be shipped in, and finished fertilizer shipped out, reducing the tonnage from Tinn. The ammonia plant was established at Rjukan in 1927, following a 1925 agreement between IG Farben of Germany, who transferred the Haber patents to Norsk Hydro in exchange for a quarter ownership, and the distribution of the products through them.

During the 1930s there was a global depression, and Norsk Hydro make an alliance with IG Farben and Imperial Chemical Industries; the rise of protectionism was causing problems due to Norsk Hydro only selling 5% of the produce domestically. This was followed by many lay-offs, and not until 1938 was Norsk Hydro able to make a profit again. During the 1930s other products came into production, including hydrogen and other gases, and from 1934 as the first plant in the world mass-produced heavy water, following a production plan by Leif Tronstad and Jomar Brun.

=== Climax ===
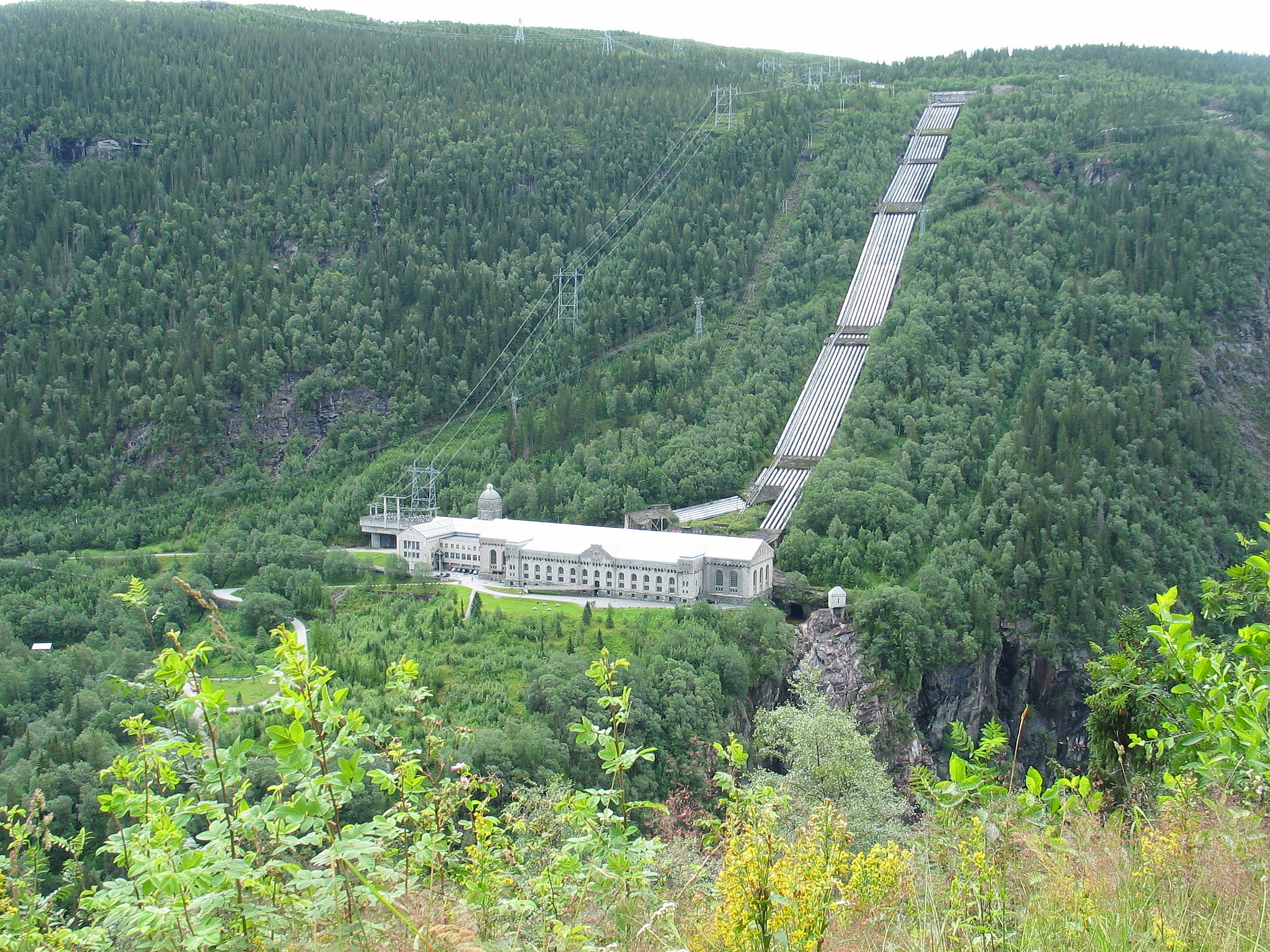
Vemork power station

After the end of the war Norsk Hydro had a strong liquidity, while the Green Revolution and increased industrialization of agriculture in Europe boomed the demand for the products; from 1945 to 1955 production increased eightfold. In 1957 five round trips had to be made by the new ferry MF Storegut each day, while the trains made nine round trips from Rjukan to Mæl; each day transporting 100 wagon with 800 tonnes potassium nitrate and 400 tonnes ammonia; by 1962 723,482 tonnes produced a year.

=== Decline ===
Norsk Hydro announced in 1963 a savings plan for its four plants in Norway; Chief Executive Officer Rolf Østbye made it clear that new technology in the production of ammonia would force the closure of the plant at Rjukan, and replace it with a petroleum-based process at Herøya. The "Rjukan situation", as it was named in the press, became a source of conflict between the local community and Norsk Hydro; initially 250 jobs were to be moved to Herøya, but in 1964 Norsk Hydro applied for permission to build a power line from Rjukan to Herøya—what would become the death sentence for the large industry at Rjukan. Permission for the construction of the power line was granted in 1968. Production of fertilizer was moved to Herøya and Glomfjord, and Rjukan transferred to production of calcium ammonium nitrate in 1963 and ammonium nitrate in 1964.

During the 1960s a series of cost reductions were introduced, after major reorganizations between 1965 and 1970; the last commuter train for the workers to the plants went on 25 May 1968, while on 31 May 1970 the last passenger train in connection with the ferries went on the Rjukan Line, being replaced with bus. In 1985 the department gave in and permitted the termination of passenger services with Storegut and Ammonia.

The plan had been producing a deficit since 1982. Norsk Hydro made an agreement with the authorities where they would create 350 new permanent jobs, create a business fund and donate NOK 60 million for the construction of a new road, Route 37, along Lake Tinn. In 1988 Norsk Hydro terminated the ammonia production, and in 1991 they also closed down the production ammonium nitrate and potassium nitrate, along with the Rjukan Line. Within a few years the number of Norsk Hydro employees in Rjukan had been reduced from 1,760 to 530 people. All the employees were either retired or moved to other areas of Norsk Hydro's enterprise.

=== Heritage ===
In 1988 the Norwegian Industrial Workers Museum was established at Vemork; by 1995 it had become a national museum. After the closing in 1991 the railway and railway ferries were preserved. In 2004 the foundation running the heritage railway was discontinued, and in 2007 the Norwegian Industry Workers Museum was launched as the new operator by the Norwegian Directorate for Cultural Heritage. This would allow the plants and Rjukan along with the railway, and equivalent closed plants at Odda to be nominated as a World Heritage Site by the directorate.

== Facilities ==
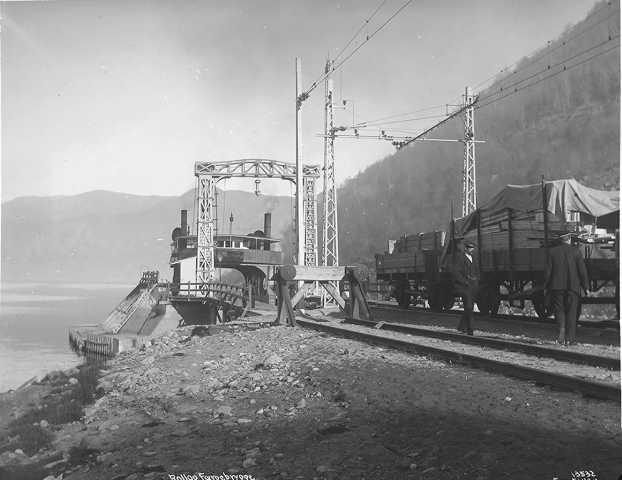
Loading cargo onto the ferry SF Rjukanfoss in 1911

=== Hydrogen plant ===
For the creation of hydrogen and oxygen, a plant was built next to Vemork. Established in 1929, it sent the products down to Rjukan via pipeline. By 1934 it was discovered that the plant was making heavy water as a byproduct; since there was a market for this amongst scientists at the time, up to 4 kilograms (8.8 lb) were produced per day. The plant was torn down after it was disused in 1971. The hydrogen plant required direct current, that could not be transported longer distances without large energy loss; therefore it had to be located right beside the power station.

=== Power plants ===
The establishment at Rjukan allowed for the exploitation of hydroelectricity from the lake Møsvatn through five power stations along the river Måna, Svelgfoss I (1907), Lienfoss (1909), Vemork (1916), Såheim (1916) and Frøistul (1926). Vemork was at the time of its opening the largest in the world, and four times larger than the runner up in Norway. To allow such high falls as 200 metres (660 ft) the newly developed pelton turbine had to be taken into use.

=== Transport ===
To transport the products to the coastal port at Skien, Norsk Hydro needed to build an extensive railway network. Cargo was stored in tank cars and transported down the 16-kilometre (10 mi) Rjukan Line to Mæl, where it was transferred to the Tinnsjø railway ferry. After a 30-kilometre (19 mi) ride across the lake, it was again transferred to the Tinnoset Line and transported 34 kilometres (21 mi) to Notodden where it was transshipped to barges and transported down the Telemark Canal. After 1919 the final stage was replaced with the 74-kilometre (46 mi) Bratsberg Line; simultaneously the Tinnoset Line was nationalized and taken over by Norwegian State Railways.

== Bibliography ==
- Payton, Gary; Lepperød, Trond (1995). Rjukanbanen på sporet av et industrieventyr. Rjukan: Maana Forlag. ISBN 82-993549-1-9.
