= SF Hydro =

Norwegian steam powered railway ferry

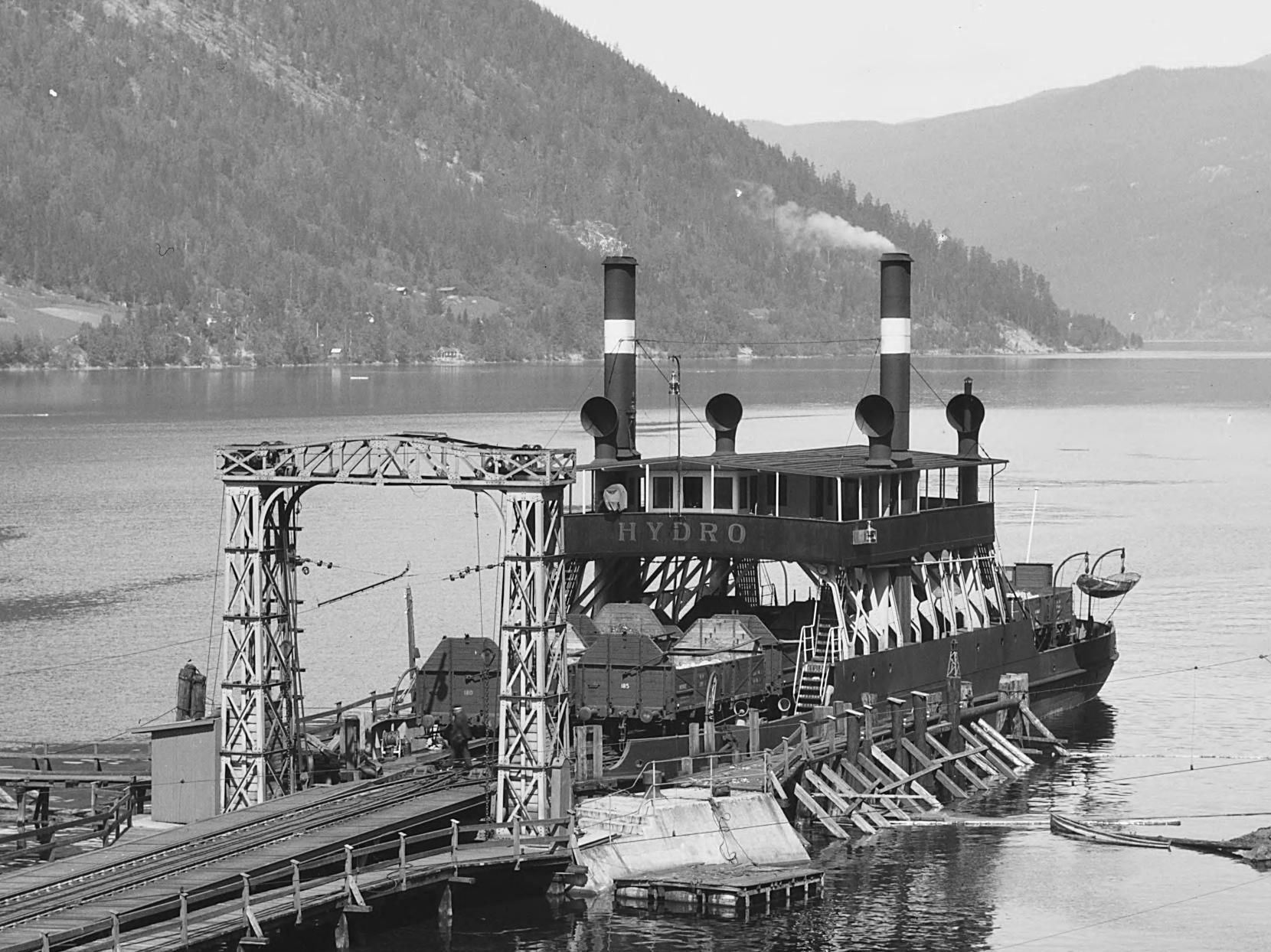
- Hydro at Mæl in 1925

History
- Name: SF Hydro
- Operator: Norsk Transport
- Port of registry: Oslo, Norway
- Route: Tinnsjø railway ferry
- Builder: Akers mek. Verksted, Oslo
- Cost: NOK 334,293
- Yard number: 374
- Launched: 10 December 1914
- Out of service: 20 February 1944
- Fate: Sunk by the Special Operations Executive (SOE) in World War II

General characteristics
- Tonnage: 493.60 tonnes
- Length: 53 m (174 ft)
- Beam: 9.6
- Draft: 3.2 m
- Installed power: 2 × 186 kW steam engines
- Speed: 8 knots
- Capacity: 120 passengers

SF Hydro was a Norwegian steam powered railway ferry that operated in the first half of the 20th century on Lake Tinn in Telemark. It connected with the Rjukan Line and Tinnoset Line, at Mæl and Tinnoset, operating between 1914 and 1944. The combined track and ferry service was primarily used to transport raw materials and fertilizer from Norsk Hydro's factory at Rjukan to the port in Skien. It was the target of a Norwegian operation on 20 February 1944, when resistance fighters sank the ferry in the deepest part of Lake Tinn to prevent Nazi Germany from receiving heavy water.

== Usage ==
The railway ferries operated a 30-kilometre (19 mi) route connecting the Tinnoset Line and Rjukan Line. Transport included both railway cars, carrying primarily fertilizer, potassium nitrate and ammonia from Norsk Hydro, as well as passengers.

Hydro was the second ship delivered for the service. The first ship, SF Rjukanfos, was delivered in 1909 but proved too small for the service. Hydro was ordered from Akers Mek. Verksted on 19 July 1913 on a bid of NOK 268,000; the final cost was NOK 334,293. It was launched on 10 December 1914, but rebuilt and relaunched on 5 June 1915 as the original configuration used excessive coal.

In 1929 Hydro was supplemented with a third ship, SF Ammonia. All three operated the route until the sinking of Hydro.

== Specifications ==
Hydro was larger than its predecessor, at 53 metres (174 ft) measuring 493.60 gross register tons. Like all the railway ferries it had two parallel tracks, which merged at the front to allow a single track to enter the ship; total track length was 80 metres (260 ft), allowing twelve wagons weighing 300 tonnes as well as 120 passengers. It was equipped with two steam engines, each at 190 kW (250 hp), giving it a cruise speed of 8 knots (15 km/h).

== Sinking ==
The German occupation of Norway (1940–1945) during World War II made Rjukanbanen the area for a crucial struggle between the Norwegian resistance movement and the Third Reich. In February 1940, before the occupation, the entire Vestfjorddalen and the docks were closed to foreigners. On 4 May 1940 German troops reached Rjukan, a month after the invasion of Norway began. The ferries were camouflaged, and by January 1941 lack of coal resulted in the steamships being fired by wood.

One of the byproducts at Rjukan was the production of heavy water—a key component in nuclear weapons, and necessary as a moderator in German nuclear designs. The hydrogen plant at Vemork was the first mass producer of heavy water, and in 1939 the German company IG Farben, owning 25% of the shares in Norsk Hydro, asked for permission to import five liters of heavy water into Germany, later denied due to a lack of an export licence. In 1939–40 production at Vemork was 20 kg (44 lb); by 1942 production had increased to 5 kg (11 lb) per day.

The first attempt to halt the production from the resistance movement was Operation Grouse in October 1942, which failed when the Germans caught the plotters. As a consequence passenger transport after 7 April 1942 from Ingolfsland Station to Rjukan was only permitted for soldiers, police, workers at the plant and schoolchildren. All filled ammonia wagons were stored indoors in a tunnel under heavy guard. On 16 November 1943 the United States Army Air Forces bombed the hydrogen plant. The attack killed 21 civilians but failed to damage the heavy water plant as it was located under seven stories of reinforced concrete.

The Germans decided to cancel production of heavy water at Rjukan and move the remainder of the potassium hydroxide, from which the heavy water was distilled, to Germany. The resistance movement was aware of this plan, and considered blowing up the train at various places, but instead chose to target the ferry SF Hydro.

To minimize the civilian losses, Kjell Nielsen at Norsk Hydro delayed the tapping of the potassium hydroxide one day to allow the shipment to be carried on a Sunday. On Saturday 19 February 1944 the plant director Bjarne Nilssen informed the railway that a wagon with potassium hydroxide would be sent with train number three the following day departing from Rjukan at 8:55 and connecting with the ferry from Mæl at 9:45; the shipment would arrive at Tinnoset at 11:35. NSB car Lf4 no. 32628 was loaded with 39 barrels, of which five 70-kilogram (150 lb) barrels were to be unloaded at Notodden. The wagons were set up at Rjukan on the Saturday, but failed a weight check, and part of the load was transferred to wagon L-84. The wagons were stored overnight with a single guard.

That same evening two civilians, Jon Berg and Oskar Andersen, were guarding the Hydro. The saboteurs Alf Larsen, Knut Lier-Hansen, Rolf Sørlie and Knut Haukelid waited a few kilometers from Mæl and broke into the ferry quay by cutting through a fence. They entered the ship, but were discovered by one of the two guards; Lier-Hansen indicated that he was a worker and wanted to sleep on board, in the end convincing the guard. Sørlie and Haukelid went below deck to the keel where they spent two hours placing 8.4 kilograms (19 lb) of plastic explosive. They placed it in a circular formation 3.6 metres (12 ft) long. The explosion would blow out one to two square meters (ten to twenty square feet) of the hull. The saboteurs left the ship unseen. Larsen and Haukelid left for Sweden while Sørlie left for Hardangervidda.

According to Anthony Cave Brown in Bodyguard of Lies, Haukelid concluded after a trial run that the explosives would be most effective if placed in the bow. If holed near the bow, the ship's screws and rudder would quickly be lifted out of the water, leaving the captain and crew without control. Haukelid also determined that "[t]he explosion had to be big enough to sink the ship, but not so severe as to cause casualties among the passengers and crew." He carried the bomb, made from eighteen pounds of Nobel 808 plastic explosive and two fuses fashioned from alarm clocks, on board in an old sack.

The timing was set to cause the ship to sink at the deepest part of the lake, but close enough to shore to allow any survivors a hope of rescue. The weather was calm; the temperature was −9 °C (16 °F). On 20 February 1944 just before reaching the lighthouse at Urdalen the bomb exploded; the ship immediately headed for land. The ship's crew failed to loosen all the lifeboats, and there were no instructions available for using the lifebelts. By the time the crew left the bridge, the ship had listed so much that they could walk down the side. At 10:30 Hydro sank, settling on the bottom at 430 metres (1,410 ft) depth. Farmers from across the lake were soon in their boats and came to the rescue of the crew and passengers.

Despite the intention to minimize casualties, 18 people were killed. Twenty-nine survived. The dead comprised 14 Norwegian crew and passengers and four German soldiers. Some of the Norwegian rescuers felt that the Germans should not be saved, but this attitude did not prevail and four German soldiers were saved. Eight days after the incident SF Rjukanfos went out to the place of the sinking for a memorial service.

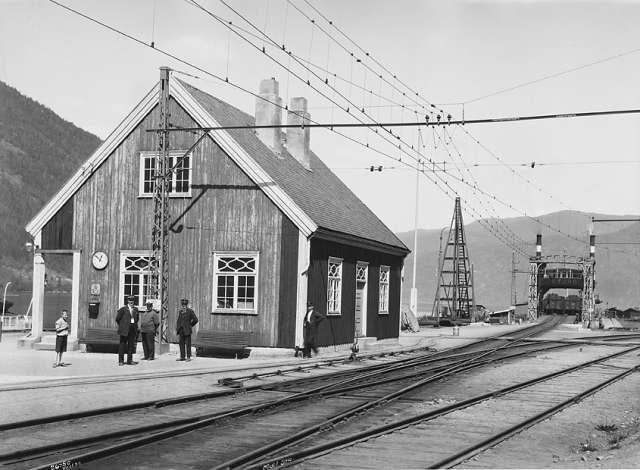
Mæl Station and DF Hydro

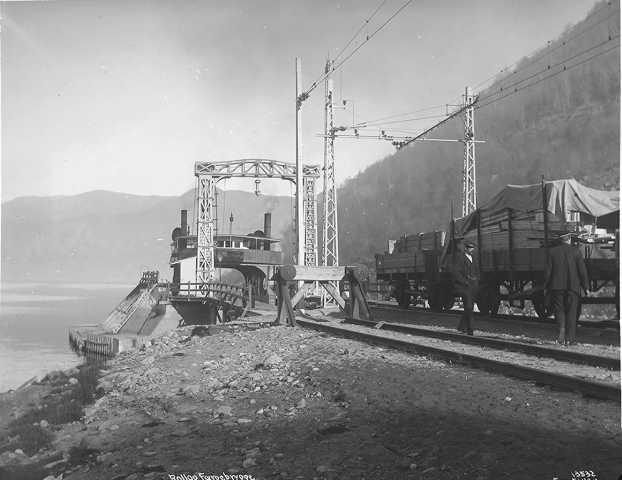
Rjukanfos docked at Mæl in 1911

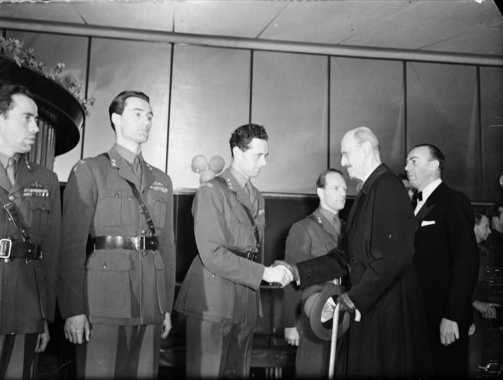
Soldiers in uniform, from the left: Knut Haukelid, Joachim Rønneberg, Jens Anton Poulsson shaking hands with King Haakon VII, Kasper Idland.

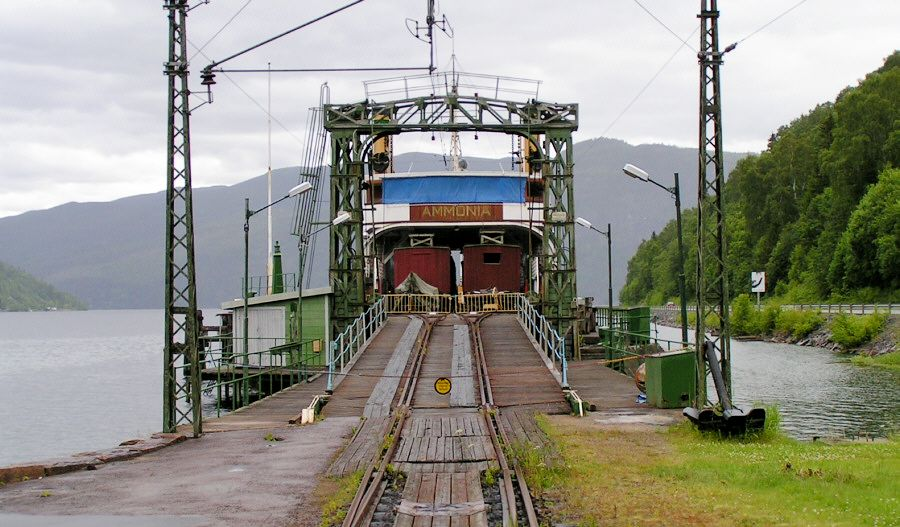
SF Ammonia, Mæl, Norway, Rjukan Line

=== Post war interest ===
In 1948 the film The Fight Over the Heavy Water premiered, depicting the various sabotage actions including the sinking of SF Hydro, featuring some of the original saboteurs.

In 1965 a British-American film, The Heroes of Telemark, depicted the same events.

In the early 1990s the wreck of Hydro was located by Thor Olav Sperre using a ROV. Found on board were 600 kilograms (1,300 lb) of heavy water, leaving no doubt that Hydro was indeed carrying the heavy water the day it was sunk. Two of the barrels were recovered, and one of them can be seen at Norsk Industriarbeidermuseum at Vemork, Rjukan.

In 2005 PBS Nova produced a documentary called Hitler's Sunken Secret. Analysis of the contents of one recovered sealed barrel (No. 26) confirmed that it contained heavy water. The barrel was donated to the US National WW2 Museum in New Orleans.

In 2015 the Norwegian Broadcasting Corporation produced the acclaimed six-episode TV miniseries The Heavy Water War.

In 2017, a new investigation of the ferry was featured in National Geographic Channel's Drain the Oceans, "Nazi Secrets" (Season 1, Episode 1).
