= Tinnoset Line =

Norwegian railway line

Coordinates: 59.6043°N 9.2781°E

Norwegian: Tinnosbanen
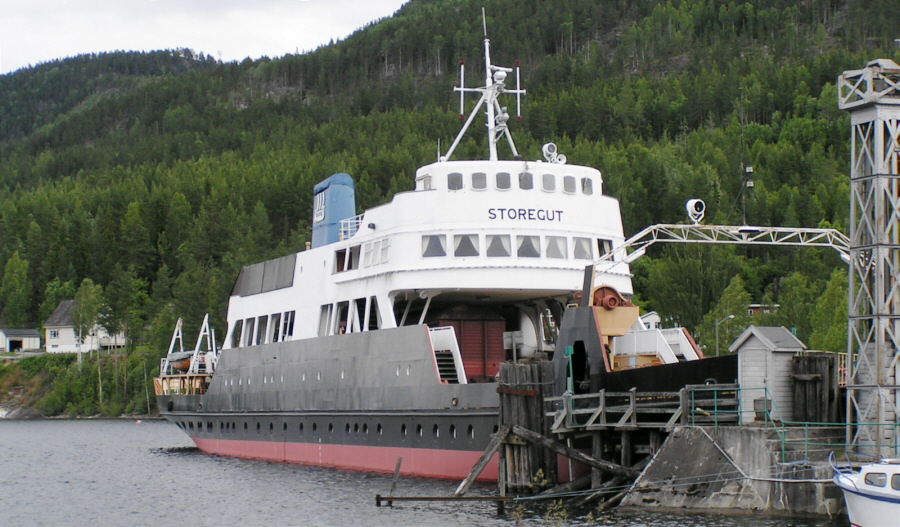
- The railway ferry MF Storegut at Tinnoset

Commercial operations
- Built by: Norsk Hydro
- Original gauge: 1,435 mm (4 ft 8 1/2 in) standard gauge
- Original electrification: 15 kV 16.7 Hz AC

Preserved operations
- Preserved gauge: 1,435 mm (4 ft 8 1/2 in)
- Preserved electrification: 15 kV 16.7 Hz AC

Commercial history
- Opened: 9 August 1909
- Closed to passengers: 1985
- Closed: 1 January 1991

Preservation history
- 1997: Ownership of track transferred to Stiftelsen Rjukanbanen

The Tinnoset Line (Norwegian: Tinnosbanen) was a 30-kilometer (19 mi) long Norwegian railway line that went from Tinnoset to Notodden in Telemark county. The railway was part of the transport chain used to transport fertilizer from Norsk Hydro's factory in Rjukan to the port in Skien. The railway opened in 1909 and was closed when the plant closed in 1991. The railway is sometimes mistakenly believed to be part of the Rjukan Line.

The railways started in the north at the mouth of Lake Tinn where the railway ferries arrived from Mæl. The railway continued south from Notodden along the Bratsberg Line. The transport chain from Rjukan to Skien consisted of four sections:

- The Rjukan Line, railway line from Rjukan to Mæl, 16 km (9.9 mi)
- Tinnsjø railway ferry from Mæl to Tinnoset, 30 km (19 mi)
- The Tinnoset Line from Tinnoset to Notodden, 34 km (21 mi)
- Telemark Canal from Notodden to Skien, 54 km (34 mi) with barge
- In 1919 the canal was replaced with the Bratsberg Line from Notodden to Skien.

== History ==
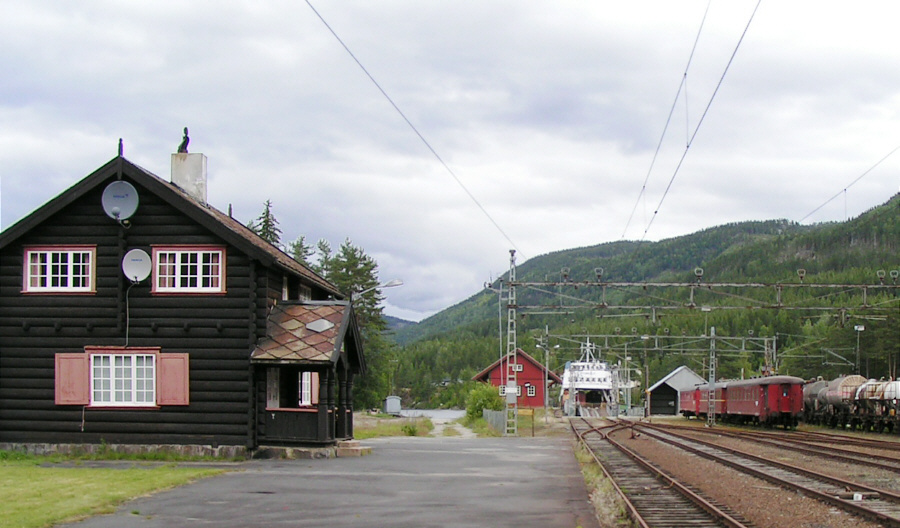
Tinnoset Station

Norsk Hydro was founded in 1905 by Sam Eyde as a Norwegian fertilizer manufacturer, and the first factory was opened in Notodden. Fertilizer factories need a lot of energy, and then it was necessary to locate the plants near hydroelectric power plants, and at Rjukan there was a large waterfall. In 1911 Rjukan Salpeterfabrikk was opened.

The Tinnoset Line was opened in 1909 as a 1,435 mm (4 ft 8 1/2 in) standard gauge railway along with the Rjukan Line and the railway ferry service, and was the second railway line in Norway, after the Thamshavn Line, to be electrified in 1911. The railway service used the Telemark Canal until 1919 when the Bratsberg Line opened from Notodden to Skien. The railway was used both to transport raw materials to the factory and to transport the finished fertilizer to the harbor at Skien. There was also passenger trains that ran.

In 1912 the state bought the Tinnos Line from Norsk Hydro, and started construction of a new railway from Notodden to Skien, to replace the canal barges, with the railway being completed in 1916. The Norwegian State Railways (NSB) took over the railway operations in 1920 when the new railway from Notodden to Kongsberg was completed.

The railway ferry service was provided by four different ships, SF Rjukanfoss, SF Hydro (1919), SF Ammonia (1929) and MF Storegut (1956). The three first were steam ships, and the latter two are still anchored at Mæl. The service was the only ever railway ferry service on a lake in Norway, and SF Ammonia is the only remaining steam-powered railway ferry in the world. In 1944, during World War II, SF Hydro was the target of the Norwegian heavy water sabotage, when the ferry was sunk to a depth of 430 metres (1,410 ft) in Lake Tinn to prevent Nazi Germany from developing nuclear weapons.

In 1929 Norsk Hydro also establish itself at Herøya in Porsgrunn, and in 1991 the factory in Rjukan, and therefore also the railway line, was closed. The passenger trains, operated by NSB, had already been discontinued in 1985. In 1997 the ownership of the track was transferred to Stiftelsen Rjukanbanen, a foundation that started heritage operation of the line in 1999.
