= SF Ammonia =

Railway ferry in Telemark, Norway

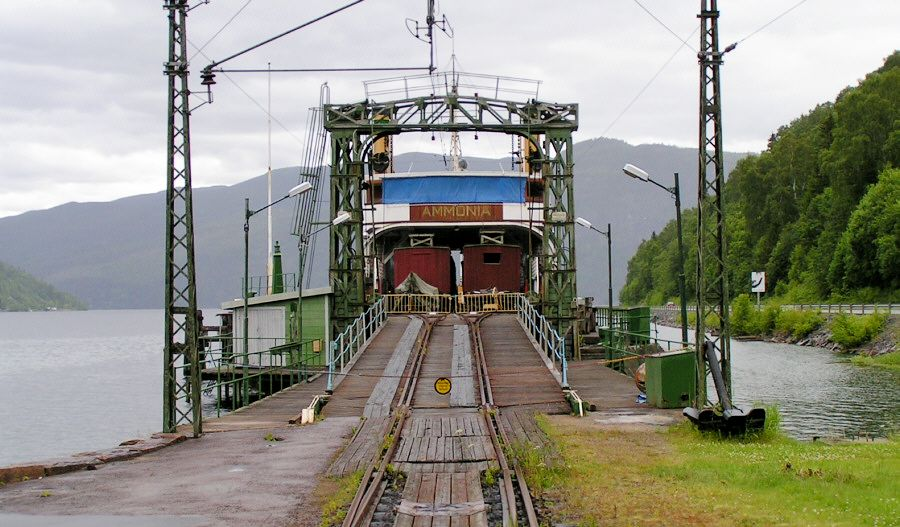
- SF Ammonia, Mæl, Norway, Rjukan Line

History

Norway
- Name: Ammonia
- Operator: Norsk Transport
- Port of registry: Skien, Norway
- Route: Tinnsjø railway ferry
- Builder: Moss Værft og Dokk
- Cost: NOK 829,485
- Launched: 18 June 1929
- Out of service: 1991
- Identification: IMO number: 8959908
- Status: Docked but still operational

General characteristics
- Tonnage: 929 gross register tons
- Length: 70.4 m (231 ft)
- Beam: 9.5 m
- Draught: 3.9 m
- Installed power: 2x 336 kW steam engines
- Speed: 12 knots
- Capacity: 250 passengers

SF Ammonia is a railway ferry on Lake Tinn in Telemark, Norway. The steam-powered ferry was one of the four railway ferries on Lake Tinn that connected the Rjukan Line with the Tinnoset Line. This system was used by Norsk Hydro to transport chemicals from Rjukan to the port in Skien. The ferry is one of four remaining steam-powered railway ferries in the world, and can still be seen docked at Mæl, Norway.

== Specifics ==
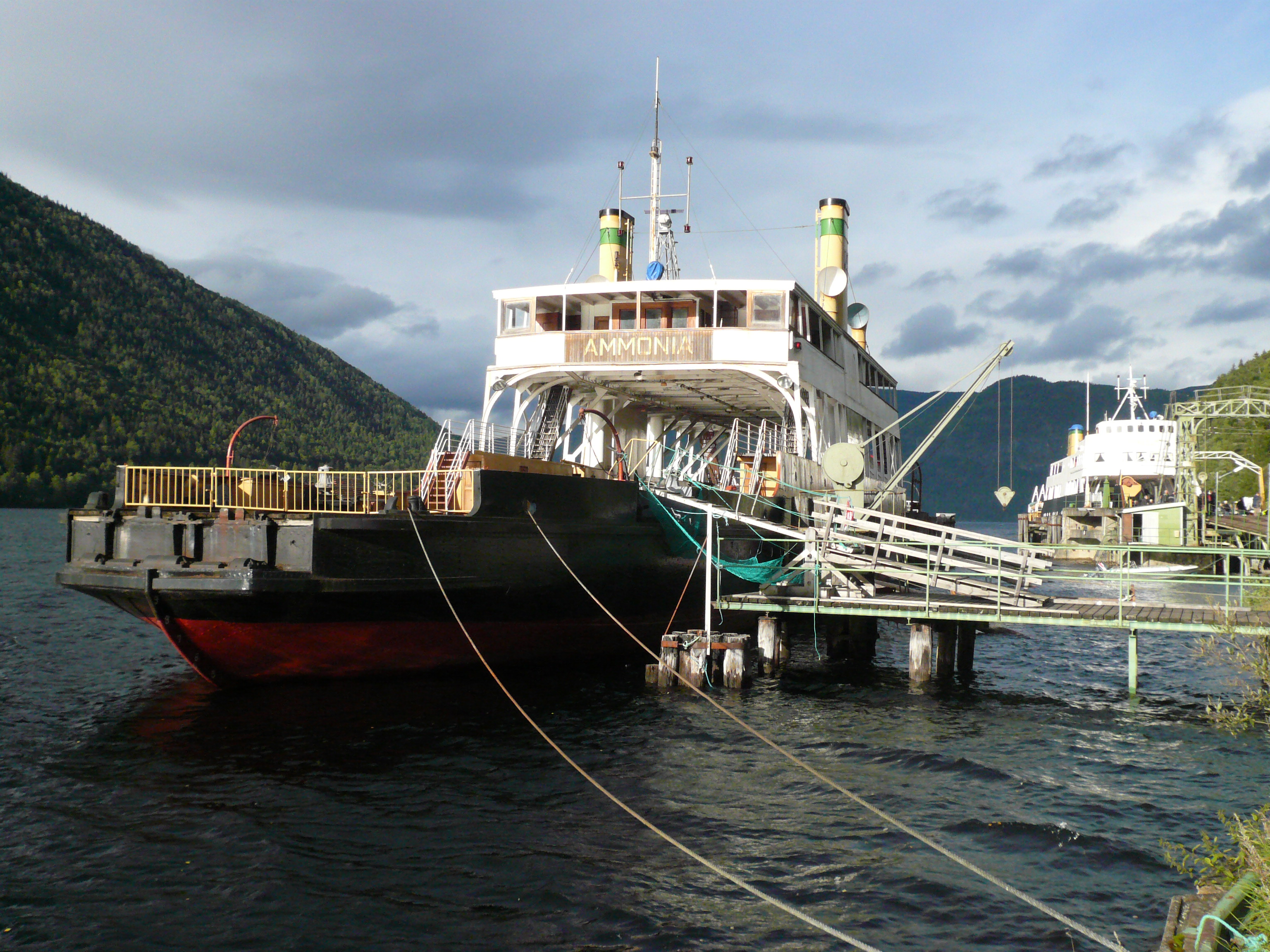
DF Ammonia at Mæl

Ammonia is capable of carrying 17 railway cars, totalling 630 tonnes, on 120 metres of track – double-track standard gauge, in addition to 150 passengers. She has two steam engines each of 300 kW (400 hp), and can achieve a speed of 12 knots (22 km/h).

== History ==
Ammonia was the third railway ferry built for Norsk Transport; when she was ordered in 1928 the two older ferries Rjukanfos and Hydro were too small. She was in reality an alternative to extending Hydro by at least twenty meters. Diesel traction was considered, but at the time diesel was not optimal for ships. She was built by A/S Moss Værtft & Dokk at the docks on Lake Tinn and launched on 18 June 1929 and cost NOK 932,000 to build, of which Norsk Transport paid NOK 829,485.

She quickly became the main ferry; in 1939 she was in service 340 days, while Hydro operated 32 days and Rjukanfos 18. After the sinking of Hydro in 1944, Ammonia had to do the main hauling across the lake, and by September 1944 she was performing eight round trips each day. In 1951 the coal boilers were replaced with petroleum-fueled ones.

When the diesel-powered MF Storegut was launched in 1956 Ammonia was down-graded to a reserve ship, mainly serving when Storegut was undergoing repairs. She also portrayed Hydro in the 1965 film The Heroes of Telemark. In the 1970s Norsk Transport considered rebuilding her to diesel-power. She was taken out of service when the railways ceased operating in 1991, but remains docked at Mæl in operational condition.

== Other sources ==
- Payton, Gary; Lepperød, Trond (1995). Rjukanbanen på sporet av et industrieventyr. Rjukan: Maana Forlag. ISBN 82-993549-1-9
