= MF Storegut =

Norwegian railway ferry

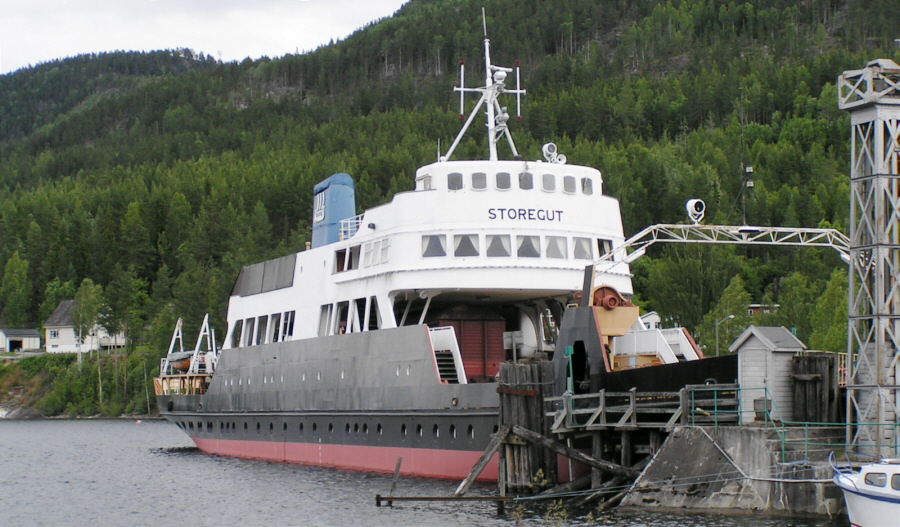

History

Norway
- Name: MF Storegut
- Owner: Norsk Transport
- Operator: Norsk Transport
- Port of registry: Skien, Norway
- Route: Tinnsjø railway ferry
- Builder: Glommens Mek. Verksted A/S
- Cost: NOK 6.5 million
- Yard number: 150
- Launched: 25 May 1956
- Out of service: 4 July 1991
- Reinstated: 2008
- Identification: IMO number: 8634431
- Status: Operational

General characteristics
- Class & type: 1.A.1.I
- Tonnage: 1119.0 gross
- Length: 87.58 m (287.35 ft)
- Beam: 11.31 m (37.1 ft)
- Draught: 3.75 m (12.3 ft)
- Installed power: 3x 590 kW MWM diesel engines
- Speed: 14 knots (26 km/h)
- Capacity: 400 passengers; 21 cars; 800 tonnes

MF Storegut is a railway ferry that operated between Tinnoset and Mæl on Lake Tinn, Norway. She was launched on 25 May 1956 and taken out of service after 4 July 1991 when the Tinnsjø railway ferry ceased operations. As of 2008 Storegut is docked at Tinnoset and is used for chartered heritage services. She is named for the poem "Storegut" by Aasmund Olavsson Vinje.

== Specifications ==
As the fourth and last delivered railway ferry for Lake Tinn, Storegut was the largest and the only one not steam powered. She has a track length of 156 metres (512 ft) on two parallel standard gauge tracks spanning the length of the vessel; allowing 21 rail cars transporting chemicals weighing 800 tonnes to be carried. In addition she could carry 400 passengers above and below deck. When she was launched she was the largest lake ferry in Northern Europe at 1,119 tonnes.

She has three diesel engines from Motoren Werke Mannheim, each at 590 kW (750 hp). Normal operation calls for use of two engines providing 13 knots (24 km/h) to 14 knots (26 km/h), but additional thrust can be provided through use of all three engines, giving 15 knots (28 km/h); The travel time on the 30 kilometres (19 mi) route was 80 minutes. The hull is in steel while the bridge is in aluminum. There were three saloons, including one for women and one for non-smokers.

== History ==
After the dramatic sinking of Hydro, the operating company Norsk Transport needed increased capacity. The old steam ferries were too small, too slow and burned too much coal for the company's liking; instead they opted for a new diesel ferry to be built. Construction started on the docks of Tinnoset in 1955 by Glommens Mek. Verksted, with completion the following year. Storegut became the main ferry for Norsk Transport, with Rjukanfoss and Ammonia as reserves—Storegut was dimensioned to handle all the transport on her own. The older ships burned two and a half times the fuel, used an extra 25 minutes on the crossing, so in 1969 Rjukanfoss was stranded and dismounted.

== Heritage ==
The ferry remained in service until the closing of the ferry service, after which she became docked at Tinnoset in an operational state, along with Ammonia. She is used as part of the heritage railway or for chartered trips. In 2004 the foundation running the ferries went bankrupt, with problems financing the necessary NOK 400,000 to keep the two remaining ferries operations. In 2008 the Norwegian Directorate for Cultural Heritage announced that they were working on making Storegut, along with the rest of the railway between Notodden and Rjukan, a World Heritage Site.
