= Shipping terminal =

The term shipping terminal may apply to facilities where loading and unloading of people or goods takes place:

  - Container terminal, a facility where cargo containers are transshipped between different transport vehicles, for onward transportation.
  - Oil terminal, an industrial facility for the storage of oil and/or petrochemical products
- Passenger terminal, a building in a port or on a dock where passengers board and disembark from passenger ships such as cruise ships and ferries

More generically, it may refer to any point where a vessel's journey ends:

- Berth, a designated location in a port or harbour used for mooring vessels
- Dock, an enclosed area of water used for loading, unloading, building or repairing vessels
- Ferry slip, a specialized docking facility that receives a ferryboat or train ferry
- Harbor, a sheltered body of water where ships, boats, and barges can be docked
- Port, a maritime facility which may comprise one or more wharves where ships may dock to load and discharge passengers and cargo
- Wharf, a structure on the shore of a harbor or on the bank of a river or canal where ships may dock to load and unload cargo or passengers
