= Tinnoset Station =

Railway station in southern Norway

Tinnoset
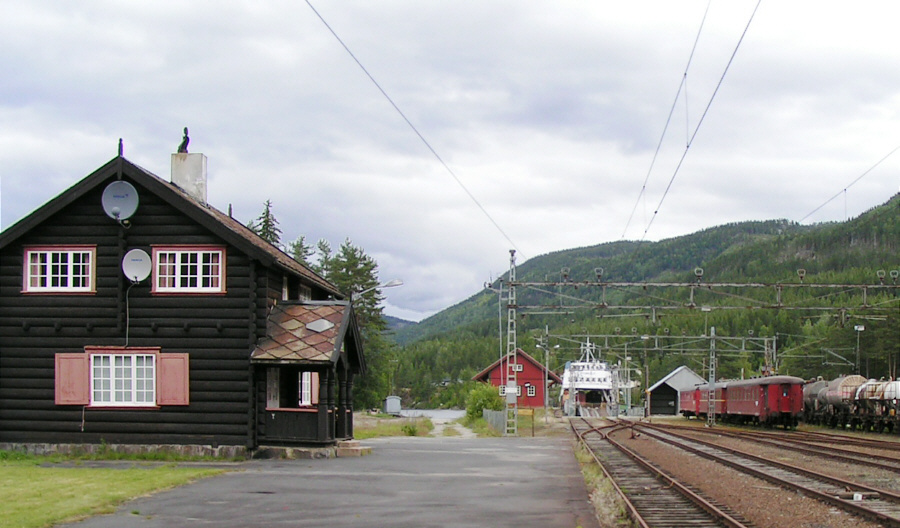
- Tinnoset Station with M/F Storegut in the background

General information
- Location: Tinnoset, Notodden Municipality; Norway
- Coordinates: 59°43′26″N 9°01′33″E
- Elevation: 193.5 m (635 ft)
- Owner: Norsk Transport (–1913); Norwegian State Railways (1913–)
- Operator: Norsk Transport (–1913); Norwegian State Railways (1913–)
- Line: Tinnoset Line
- Distance: 175.12 km
- Platforms: 1
- Connections: Ferry: Tinnsjø railway ferry

Construction
- Architect: Thorvald Astrup

History
- Opened: August 9, 1909
Location

Tinnoset Station (Norwegian: Tinnoset stasjon) is a disused railway station on the Tinnoset Line located at Tinnoset in Notodden Municipality, Norway. At the station's docks wagons were transferred from trains to the Tinnsjø railway ferry.

The station building is built in a nationally romantic style with logs, designed by architect Thorvald Astrup. It was finished in 1908 but did not open until August 9, 1909. It remained staffed until 1988. On January 1, 1991, the station closed after all passenger traffic was ended on the Tinnoset Line, as was freight traffic the following summer.
