= Ferry slip =

Docking facility for a ferry

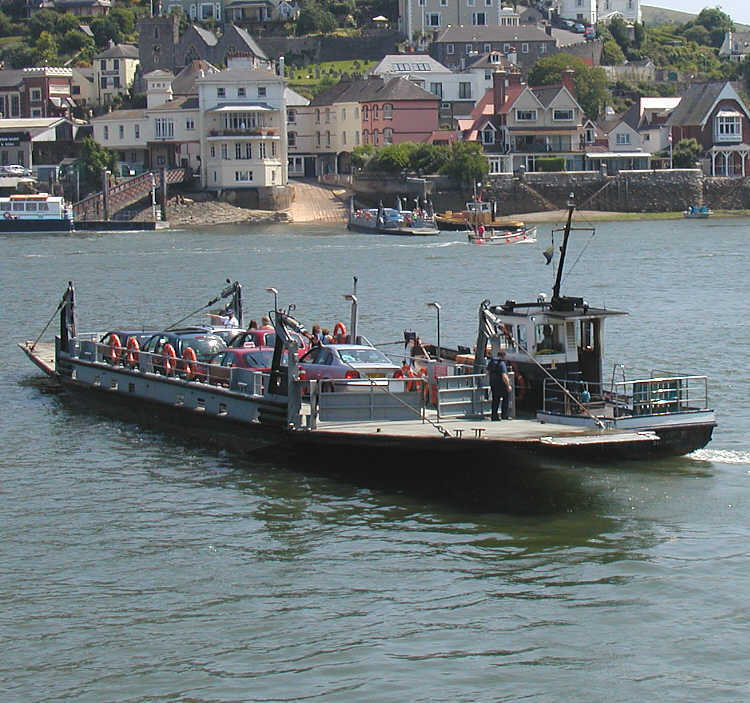
Tug-propelled Dartmouth ferry barge with integral ramp at each end

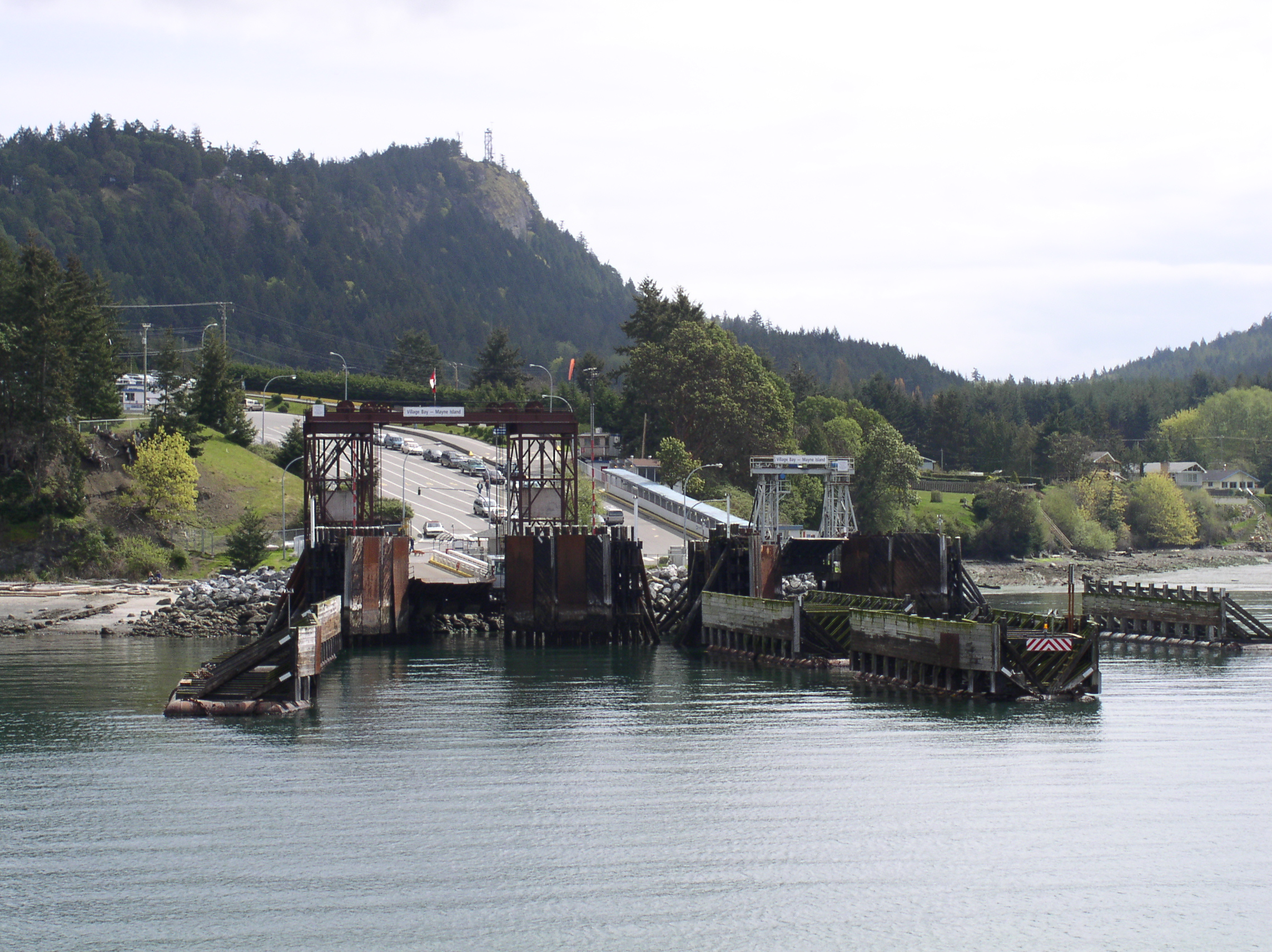
BC Ferries Dock seen from the ship about to dock

A ferry slip is a specialized docking facility that receives a ferryboat or train ferry. A similar structure called a barge slip receives a barge or car float that is used to carry wheeled vehicles across a body of water.

Often a ferry intended for motor vehicle transport will carry its own adjustable ramp - when elevated it acts as a wave guard and is lowered to a horizontal position at the terminus to meet a permanent road segment that extends under water. In other cases, the ramp is installed at the ferry slip and is called a linkspan or apron. Such a ramp is adjustable to accommodate varying water heights and ferry loadings and to move it out of the way during approach and exit. If railcars are carried by the ferry the apron will have tracks for them.

== San Francisco example ==
In the example shown below, a tugboat was positioned on the left side of the barge (our right in the apron view), pulling it with a stout rope called a springline. Nearly identical structures were used around San Francisco Bay. Unlike the electric motor drive used here and elsewhere, the Point Richmond ferry slip used water tanks as a portion of the counterweight, with the amount of water (provided by gravity from a local creek) regulated to move the apron up or down by admitting or draining water from the tanks.

Railcar barge slip

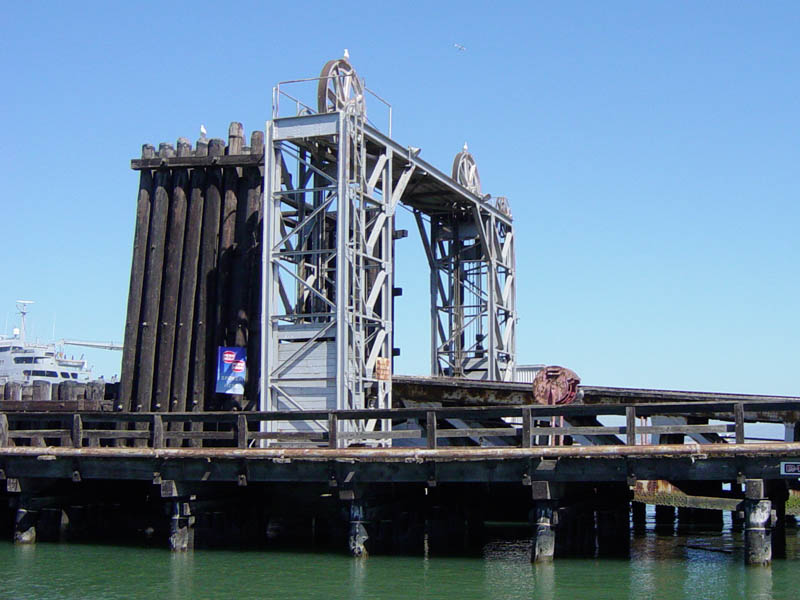

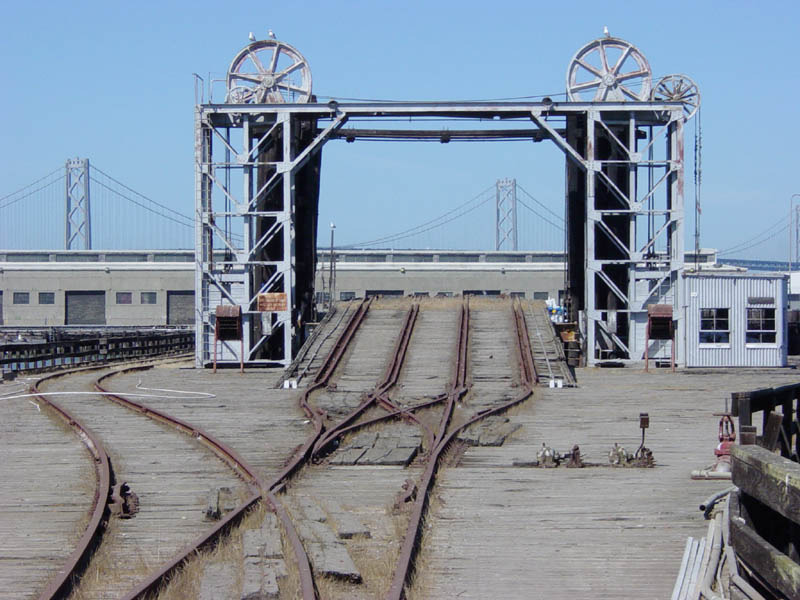

Left: Headworks to lift and lower apron. Right: Apron for railcars.

Here, three tracks are provided for loading the barge. On the barge the three tracks are spread to allow clearance for the freight cars. The slip consists of pilings and guide boards to accurately position the barge relative to the apron. Once the barge is located properly, links are lowered from the apron to engage hooks on the barge, locking the linkspan and barge together.

While the apron shown could bear the weight of a locomotive, it could not withstand the traction, so a string of flatcars was used to link the locomotive to a short string of railcars, which were then moved on or off of the barge. If a locomotive was to be moved (a rare event), it would be moved by another locomotive using the same method. The auxiliary track to the left of the headworks was for storage of the flatcar string.

=== Historical significance of this example ===
This example, located in San Francisco, California, south of China Basin was a principal crew change point for maritime operations of the Santa Fe Railroad. It is no longer in use. It remains intact but there are no longer any connecting rails along the shoreline - once the province of the San Francisco Belt Railroad, operated along The Embarcadero by the state of California in support of maritime traffic. This was used extensively in an era when large cargo ships would contain crates or pallets of stores, moved to and from the ship's cargo holds by crews of stevedores and on the docks by crews of longshoremen, with the ship's own spar cranes and winches used for movement. Transport to and from the docks was mostly by rail. Rather than make a long trip down the San Francisco Peninsula, railcars were barged about the bay, both by the Santa Fe and by the Southern Pacific. Southern Pacific eventually replaced their multiple tug and barge system with a single specialized ferryboat. Two ferry slips were used by Santa Fe in San Francisco, here near China Basin, and at the north edge of town near the Maritime Museum. Most traffic would be taken across the bay to Oakland or Richmond for connection with the major transcontinental rail lines, with a small amount of traffic for California's northern coastal region (the so-called Redwood Empire) passing through a slip at Tiburon on Richardson Bay.

San Francisco is no longer a significant port for freight as the mode of transport is now in containers, carried by container ships. The containers are loaded on and off ships at the Port of Oakland across the bay, conveniently close to the land modes of container transport - railroad and specialized trucking. The rise of the Port of Oakland and its dominance over San Francisco as a freight port is an example of the exploitation of a disruptive technology by a competitor with a relatively insignificant investment in the older form of the technology.

Facilities very similar to those pictured above were still in commercial operation as of 2007 in the Port of New York and New Jersey, transferring freight cars between Greenville Yard in Jersey City, New Jersey, and Bush Terminal Yard in Brooklyn, New York. They are run by New York New Jersey Rail, LLC.

== Gallery ==
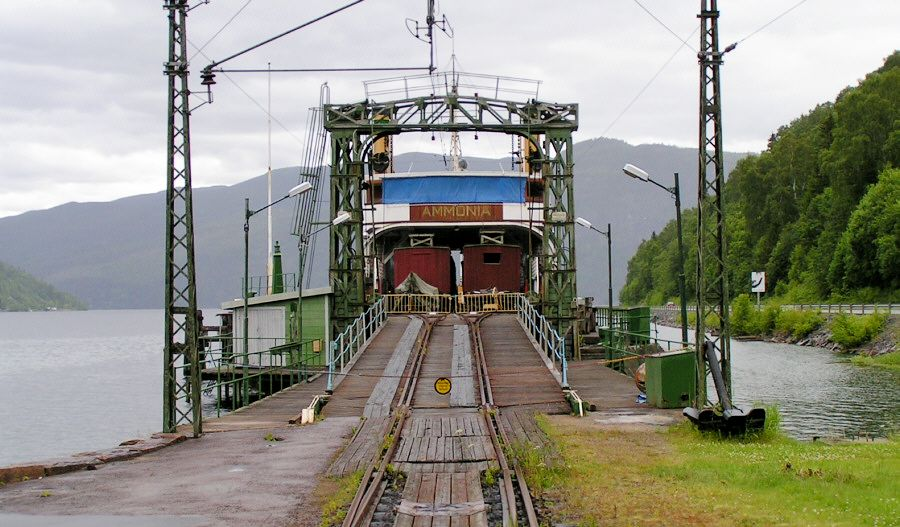
Two track rail apron and Tinnsjø railway ferry SF Hydro

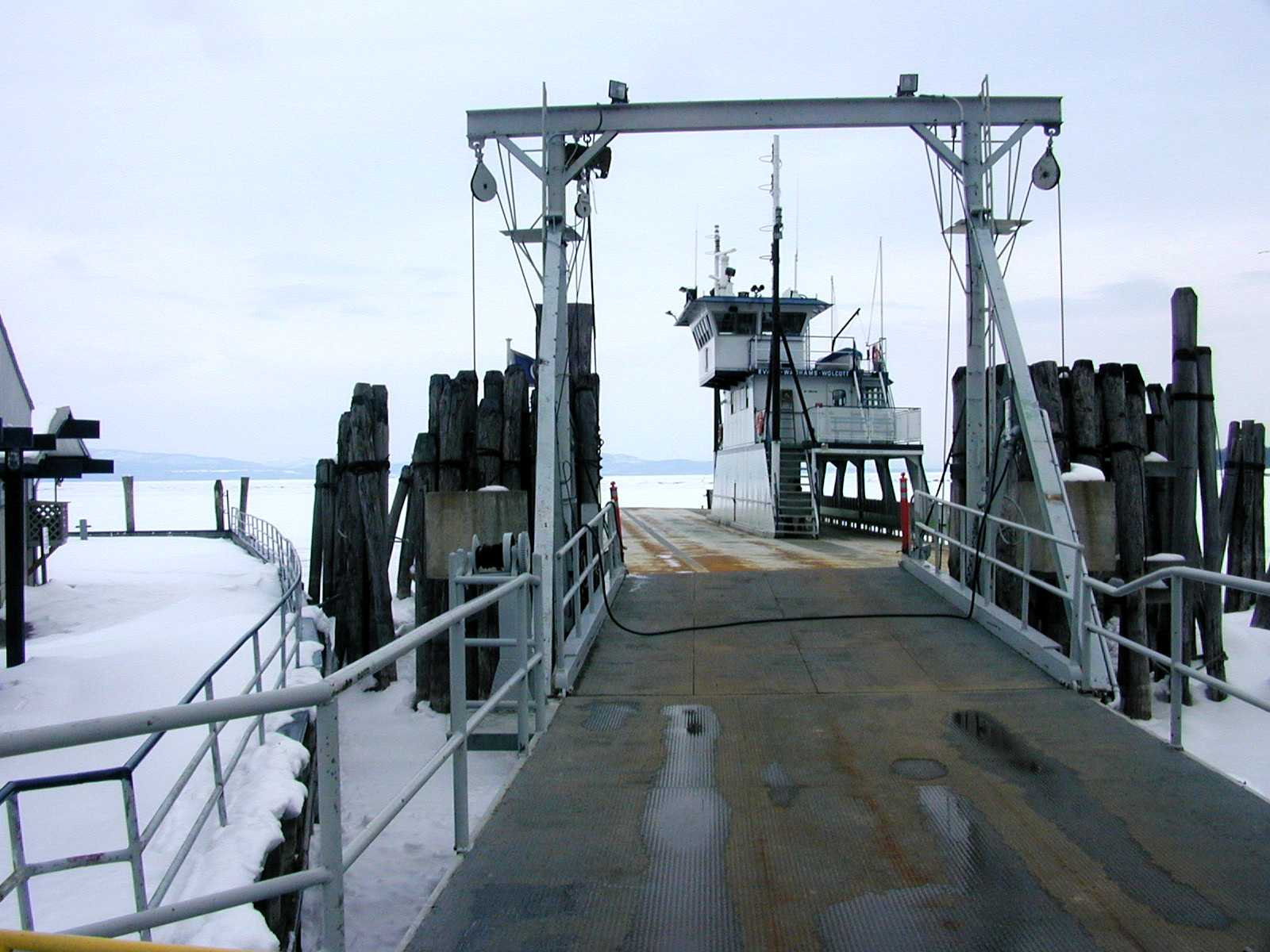
Automobile apron and ferry of the Lake Champlain Transportation Company

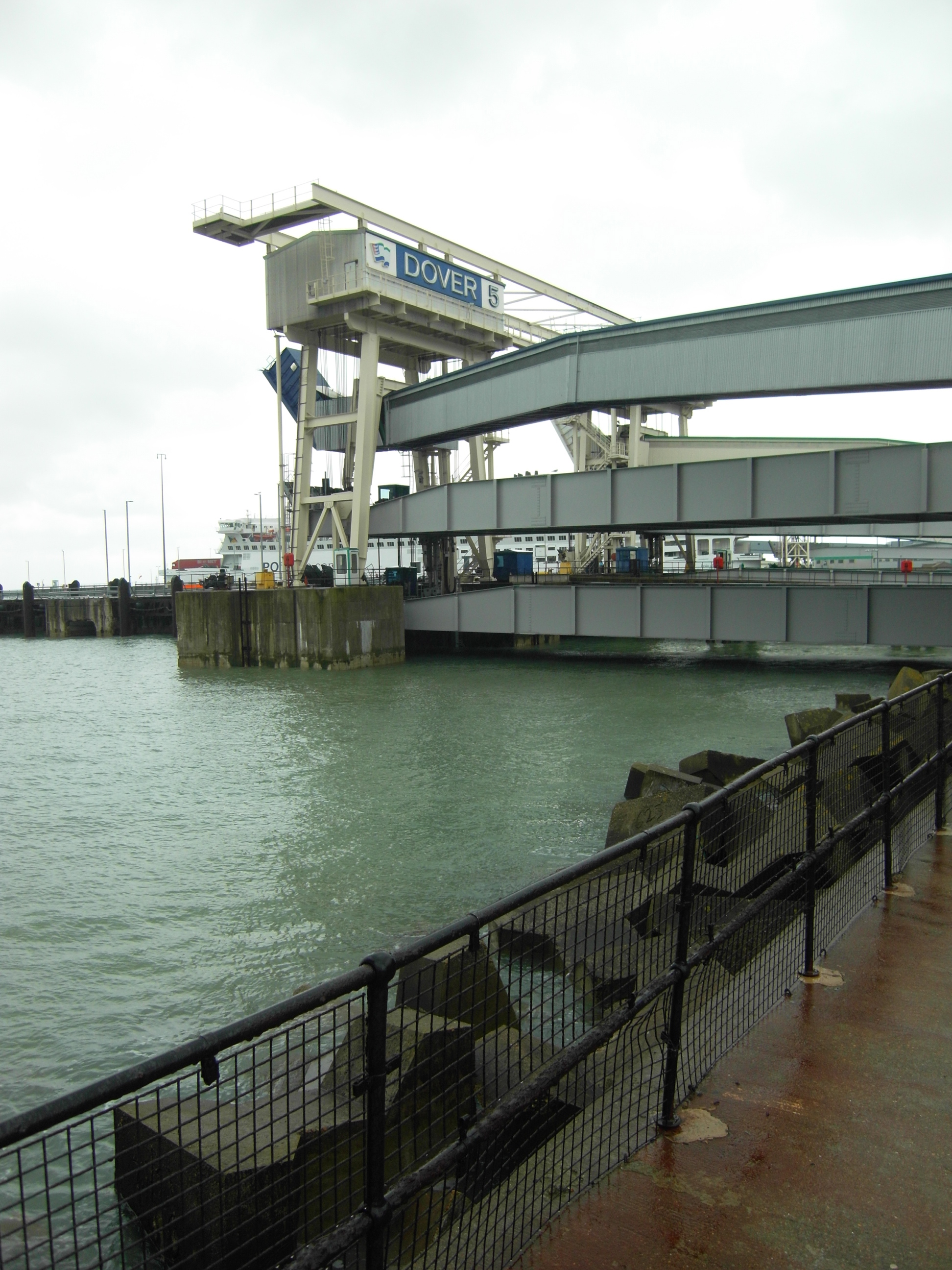
modern ferry slip at the Port of Dover

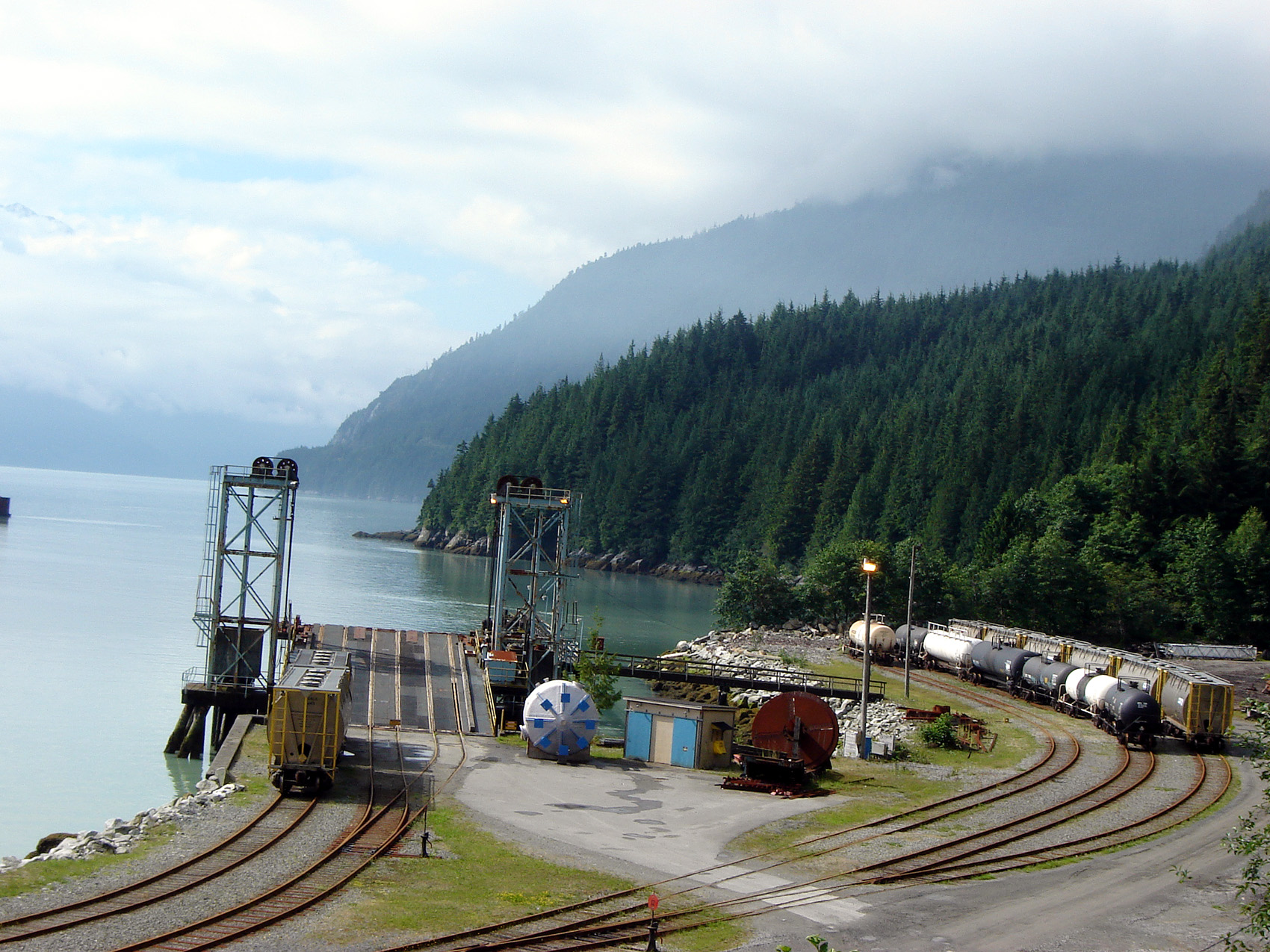
Woodfibre, British Columbia

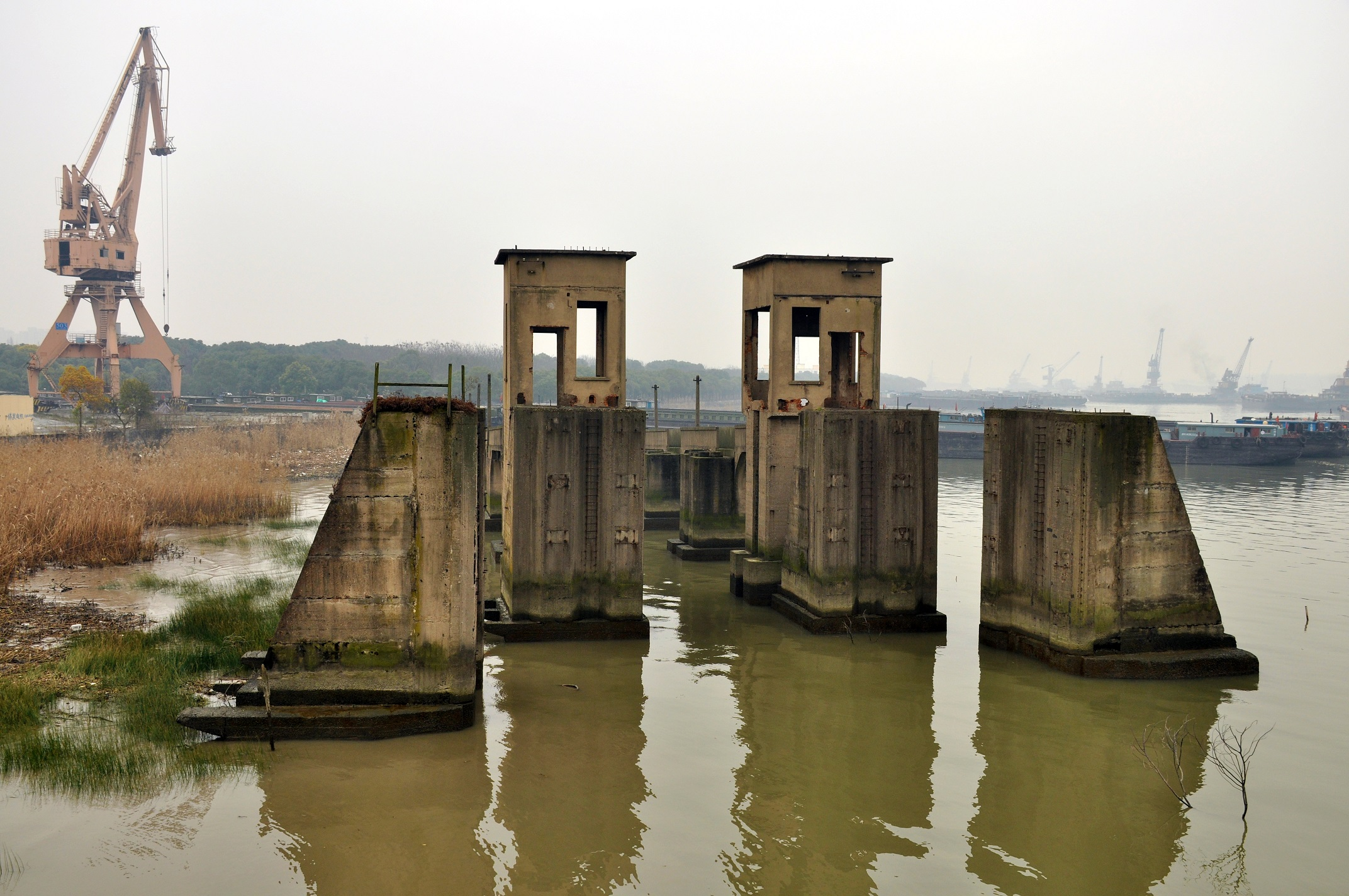
The only ferry slip in the history of Transport in Shanghai

== See also ==
- Breakover angle
- Car float
- Drawbridge
- Ferry
- Ferry terminal
- Gantry crane
- Landing (water transport)
- Linkspan
- Movable bridges for a list of other movable bridge types
- New York Central Railroad 69th Street Transfer Bridge
- Port
- Roll-on/roll-off
- Slipway
- Train ferry
