= Tinnåa =

River in Telemark, Norway

Tinnåa Tinne Tinnelva
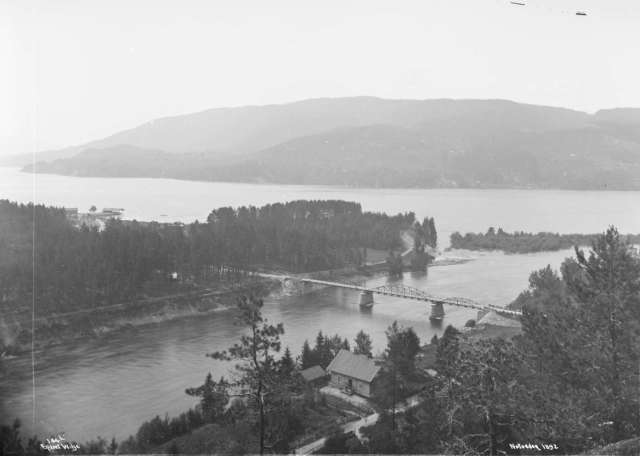
- Tinnelva and Tinnsjå

Location
- Country: Norway
- County: Telemark
- Municipalities: Notodden Municipality

Physical characteristics
- Source: Tinnsjå lake
  - location: Tinnoset, Telemark
  - coordinates: 59.72428061°N 9.0234661°E
  - elevation: 192 metres (630 ft)
- Mouth: Heddalsvatnet lake
  - location: Notodden, Telemark
  - coordinates: 59.557113°N 9.2479133°E
  - elevation: 16 metres (52 ft)
- Length: 29 km (18 mi)

Basin features
- River system: Skien watershed

Tinnåa or Tinne is a river in Notodden Municipality in Telemark county, Norway. The 29-kilometre (18 mi) long river flows between two lakes: Tinnsjå and Heddalsvatnet. The river begins at the village of Tinnoset draining from the lake Tinnsjå. It flows to the south and east, past the village of Gransherad and the Gransherad Church, past the Lisleherad Church further downstream, and finally emptying into the lake Heddalsvatnet at the town of Notodden.

There are several waterfalls along the river: Årlifossene, Grønvollfoss, Svelgfoss and Tinnfoss. These waterfalls are exploited for hydroelectric power generation since the river drops about 138 metres (453 ft) over these four waterfalls. The hydroelectric power stations along the river have a combined installed capacity of 182 megawatts (244,000 hp).

== See also ==
- List of rivers of Norway
