= Tinnsjø railway ferry =

Norwegian railway ferry service on Lake Tinn

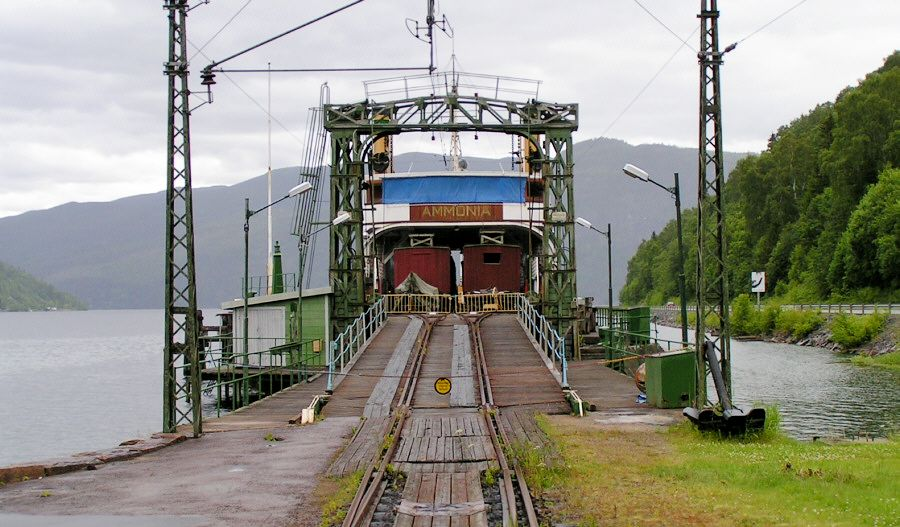
- SF Ammonia, the world's only remaining steam-powered railway ferry, docked at Mæl
- Locale: Telemark, Norway
- Waterway: Lake Tinn
- Transit type: Railway ferry
- Carries: Trains
- Terminals: Mæl Station; Tinnoset Station
- Operator: Norsk Transport
- Began operation: 8 December 1911
- Ended operation: 5 July 1991
- No. of vessels: 4 total SF Rjukanfoss; SF Hydro; SF Ammonia; M/F Storegut
- Connections at Mæl
- Train: Rjukanbanen
- Bus: Tinn Billag (1971–85)
- Connections at Tinnoset
- Train: Tinnoset Line

Tinnsjø railway ferry was a Norwegian railway ferry service on Lake Tinn that connected the Rjukan Line and Tinnoset Line. The 30-kilometer (19 mi) long ferry trip made it possible for Norsk Hydro to transport its fertilizer from the plant at Rjukan to the port in Skien. The ferry services were operated by the company's subsidiary Norsk Transport from 1909 to 1991, when the plant closed.

One of the ferries was in 1944 the target of the Norwegian heavy water sabotage when it was sunk to 430 meters (1,411 ft) depth to prevent Nazi Germany from developing nuclear weapons.

== History ==
Norsk Hydro was founded in 1905 by engineer and industrialist Sam Eyde as a fertilizer manufacturer. The first factory was opened at Notodden in 1907. Fertilizer factories need a lot of energy, making it beneficial to locate the plants near hydroelectric power plants. At Rjukan there was a large waterfall capable of supporting a hydroelectric plant. By 1911 Rjukan Salpeterfabrikk was opened.

The Tinnsjø railway ferry service was opened in 1909 along with the Tinnoset Line and Rjukan Line. After the Thamshavn Line, these two lines were the second railway line in Norway to be electrified in 1911. The railway service used Telemark Canal until 1919 when the Bratsberg Line opened from Notodden to Skien. The railway was used both to transport raw materials to the factory and the finished fertilizer to the harbour at Skien. Passenger trains were also operated.

In 1929 Norsk Hydro also establish itself at Herøya in Porsgrunn, and in 1991 the factory in Rjukan, and therefore also the railway line, was closed. The passenger trains had been discontinued already in 1970. In 1997 the ownership of the track was transferred to Stiftelsen Rjukanbanen, a foundation that started heritage operation of the line in 1999.

== Ferries ==
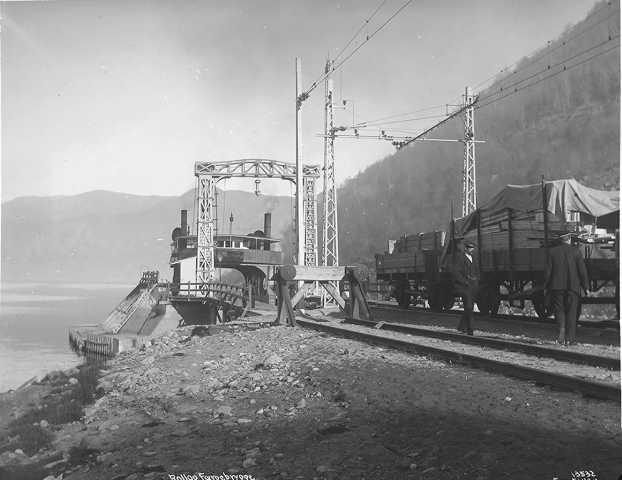
SF Rjukanfos docked at Mæl

The railway ferry service was provided by four ships, SF Rjukanfoss, SF Hydro, SF Ammonia and MF Storegut. The three first were steam ships, and the latter two are still docked at Mæl. The service was the only ever railway ferry service on a lake in Norway, and D/F Ammonia is the only remaining railway ferry steam ship in the world.

=== SF Rjukanfos ===
SF Rjukanfos, built in 1909, was the first railway ferry on Lake Tinn. The steam ship was 42.2 m (138.5 ft) long and 9.8 m (32.2 ft) wide and measured 338 GRT. It operated up to two daily departures each way, with a capacity of 120 passengers. The ship was rebuilt in 1946 to 648 GRT but taken out of service and scrapped in 1969.

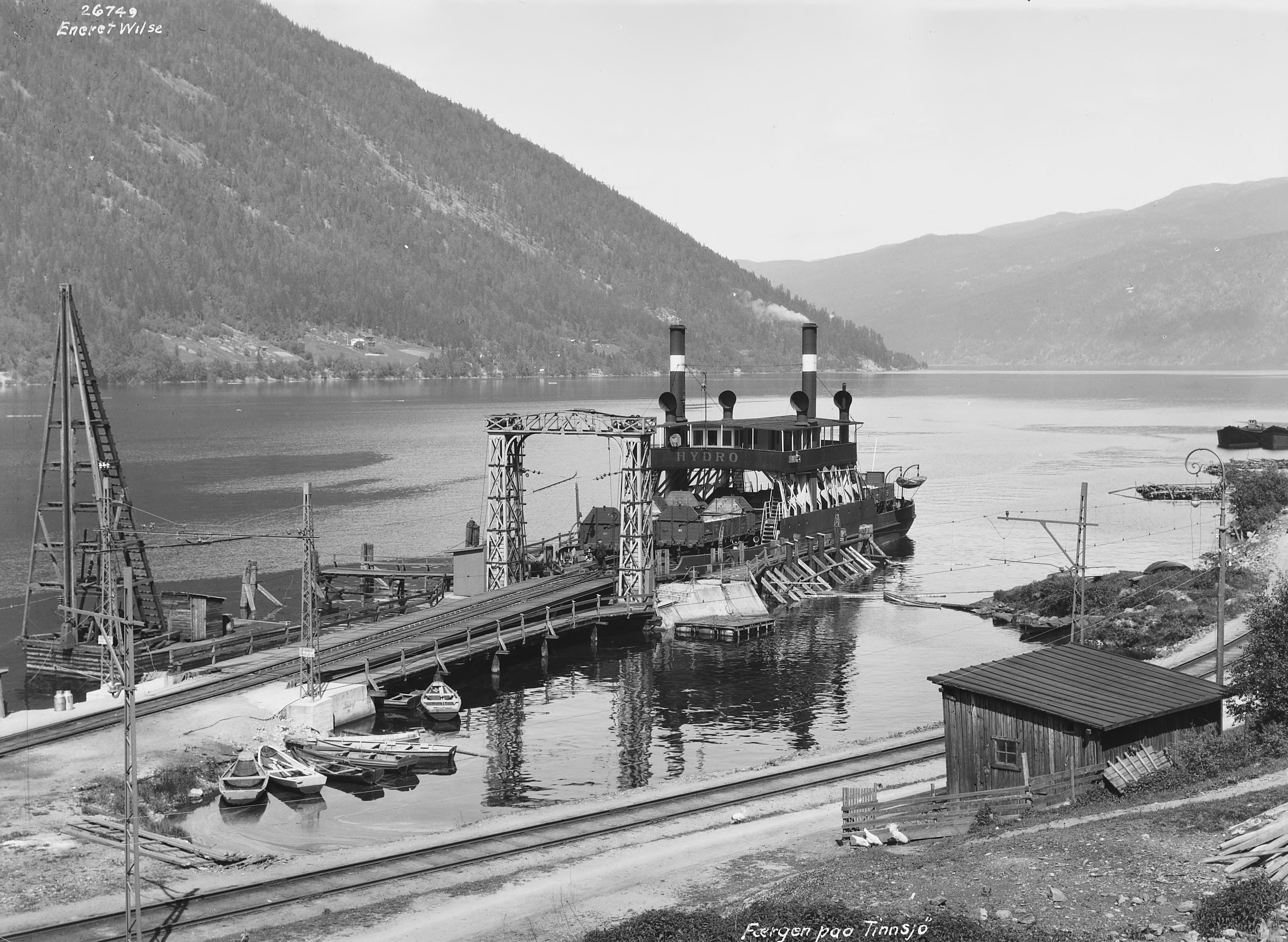
SF Hydro docket at Mæl

=== SF Hydro ===
SF Hydro was the next ship to operate as railway ferry, entering service in 1914. It was slightly larger than Rjukanfoss, at 439 GRT, 53 m (173.9 ft) long and with two 186 kW (249 hp) engines. On February 20, 1944, the ship was blown up by the Norwegian resistance movement at Lake Tinn's deepest point, 430 meters (1,411 ft) with a load of heavy water onboard heading for Germany. It is believed that 18 people were killed while 29 survived the sabotage.

=== SF Ammonia ===
In 1929 Norsk Hydro expanded their plant, and there was need for a third ferry. SF Ammonia was built the same year and was the largest of the three steam ships at 929 GRT, two 336 kW (451 hp) engines and a length of 70.4 m (231 ft). It had a capacity of 250 passengers. From 1957 it was made a reserve ferry when Storegut entered service. It was taken out of service in 1991 when the railway closed, but can still be seen docked at Mæl. It is the only remaining steam powered railway ferry in the world.

=== MF Storegut ===
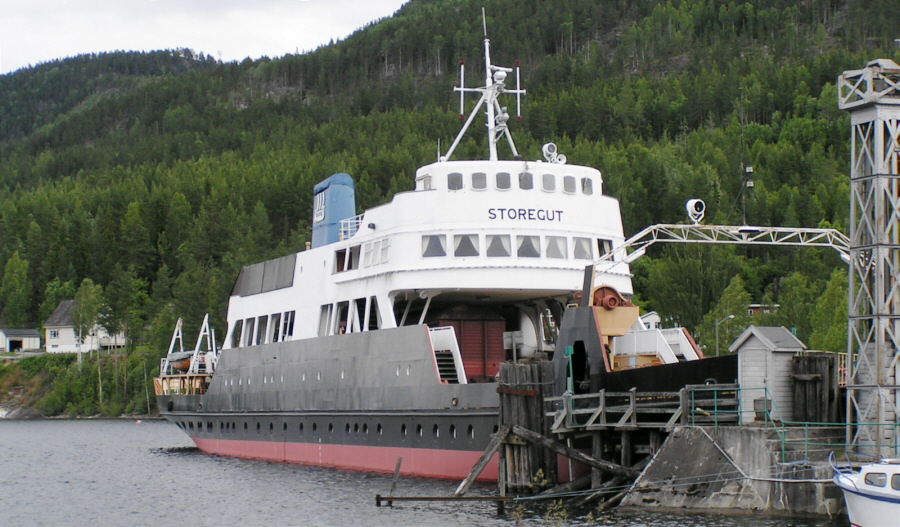
MF Storegut docked at Tinnoset

MF Storegut is the last ferry and the only motor ship to operate on the lake. Built in 1956, it measures 1,119 GRT, is 82.7 m (271.3 ft) long with three 1,678 kW (2,250 hp) diesel engines. The passenger traffic with the ship terminated in 1985, and it was taken out of service in 1991 and is docked at Mæl.

== See also ==
- Linkspan
- Ferry slip
- SS Badger, an operational coal-fired, steam-powered railway ferry on Lake Michigan, converted to carferry service.
