= Jomar Brun =

Norwegian chemical engineer (1904–1993)

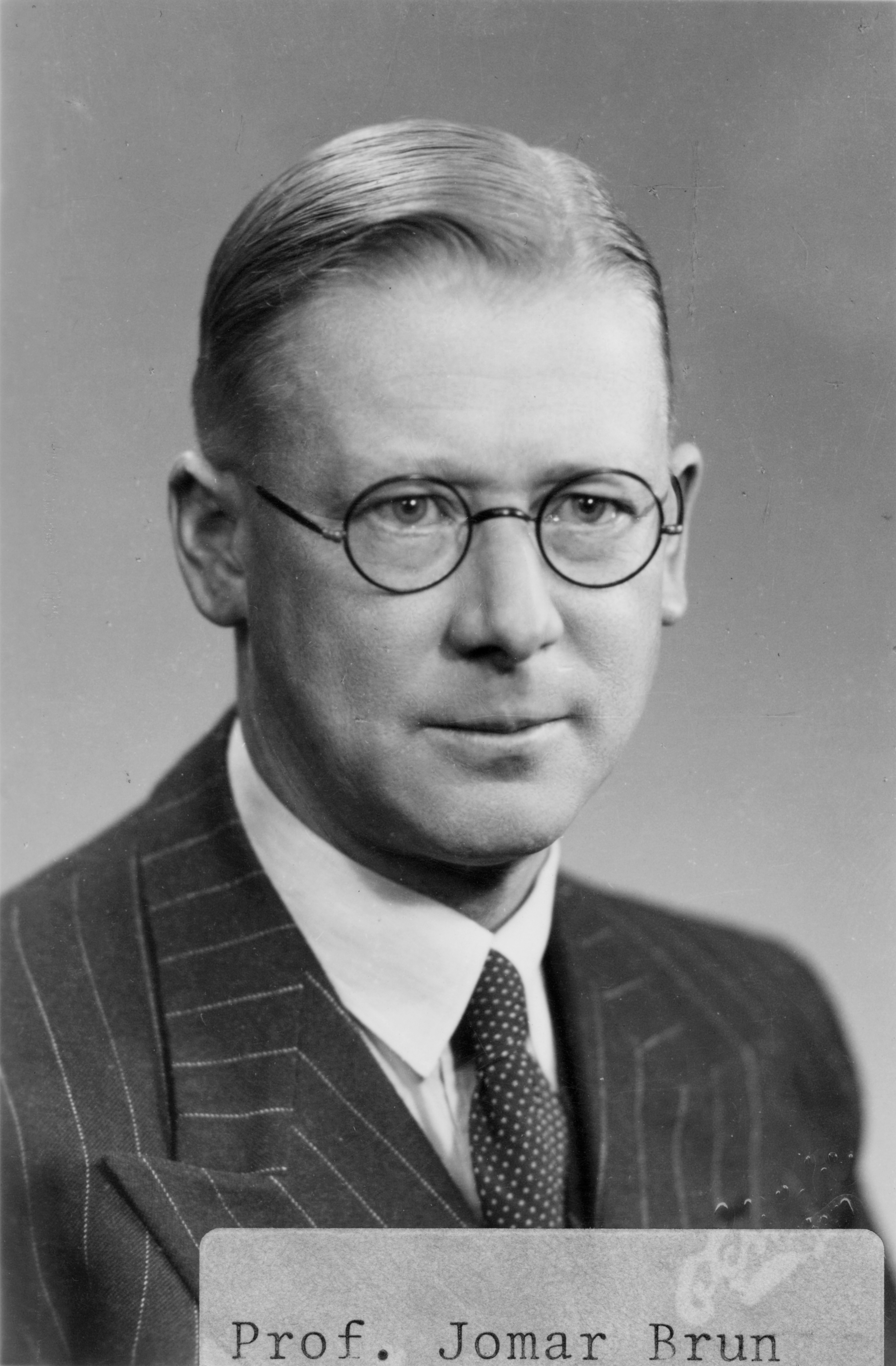
- Born: 18 June 1904; Trondheim, Norway
- Died: 26 August 1993 (aged 89)
- Education: Norwegian Institute of Technology
- Occupations: Chemical engineer; Professor of electrochemistry
- Awards: Order of the British Empire; Legion of Honour

Jomar Brun MBE (18 June 1904 – 26 August 1993) was a Norwegian chemical engineer.

== Career ==
Brun graduated from the Norwegian Institute of Technology in 1926, and worked for Norsk Hydro from 1929. He was central in the planning and running of the world's first industrial heavy water plant at Norsk Hydro Rjukan. During World War II he was called to London, and contributed to the planning phase of Operation Freshman and Operation Gunnerside, the heavy water sabotage at Vemork. He was decorated with the Order of the British Empire, and Officer of the French Legion of Honour. From 1951 he was appointed professor of electrochemistry at the Norwegian Institute of Technology in Trondheim.

== Personal life ==
Brun was born in Trondheim on 18 June 1904, to Lorentz H. Brun and Ingrid Lysholm. He married Tomy Johanne Svingjom in 1941.
