= Norwegian Industrial Workers Museum =

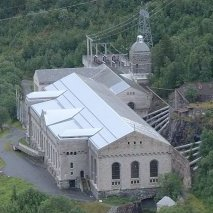
- The museum located at Vemork
- Established: June 20, 1988
- Location: Vemork, Rjukan, Norway
- Coordinates: 59.87203°N 8.49457°E
- Type: Industrial museum
- Website: visitvemork.com

Norwegian Industrial Workers Museum (Norwegian: Norsk Industriarbeidermuseum) is an industrial museum located at Rjukan in Tinn Municipality, Norway. Located in the Vemork power station, it was established in 1988 to allow the preservation of industrial society created by Norsk Hydro when they established themselves in Rjukan in 1907. The museum is an anchor point on the European Route of Industrial Heritage.

== Premise ==
The research and exhibitions of the museum span the history of power-intensive industry in Norway after 1900; including hydroelectricity, electrochemical industry and the premise for the workers. In particular local heritage from Tinn and the Norwegian heavy water sabotage are given high priority.

== History ==
The foundation running the museum was established on November 3, 1983 by the municipality, the Norwegian Water Resources and Energy Directorate and the labour unions Norwegian Confederation of Trade Unions, Norwegian Workers Education Association, Norwegian Union of Chemical Industry Workers and EL & IT Forbundet. Later this was supplemented by the United Federation of Trade Unions, Statkraft and Statnett, but the latter two have since left. The museum moved into the Vemork power station, since Norsk Hydro had abandoned the hydrogen plant in 1971—and the first plant in the world to mass-produce heavy water. The first curator was hired in 1984, followed by two more employees in 1985. This phase of the establishing had a widespread goal, attempting to preserve both pre- and post-industrial heritage from Rjukan, including the establishment of Tinn Museum, a heritage village dedicated to the preindustrial society, in 1984. The permanent exhibition at Vemork was opened on June 20, 1988.

In 2004, Tinn Museum was integrated into the Norwegian Industrial Workers Museum; which has the responsibilities for preserving local history from Tinn. This includes a digitalized collection of more than 30,000 photographs. The industry at Rjukan had its own railway, Rjukanbanen, that connected to the Tinnsjø railway ferry. In 2004 the foundation running the heritage railway was discontinued, and in 2007 the Norwegian Industry Workers Museum was launched as the new operator by the Norwegian Directorate for Cultural Heritage. This would allow the plants and Rjukan along with the railway, and equivalent closed plants at Odda to be nominated as a World Heritage Site by the directorate. In 2007 the Norwegian Ministry of Culture announced they would give NOK 8 million for the expansion of the museum.

== See also ==
- Heddal Open Air Museum
