= Tinnoset =

Village in Notodden Municipality, Norway

- Village
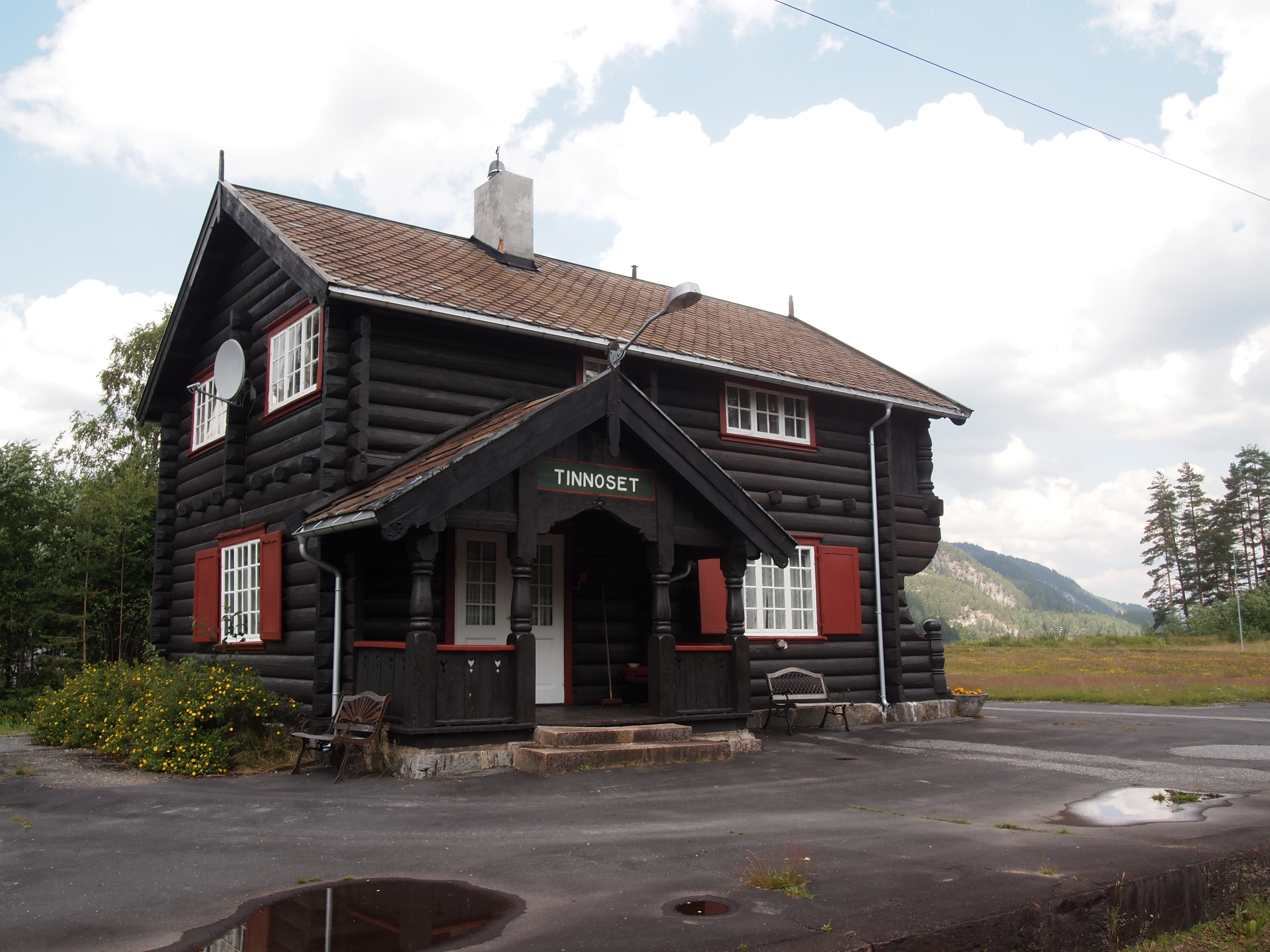
- View of the village railway station
- Interactive map of Tinnoset
- Coordinates: 59.72469°N 9.02712°E
- Country: Norway
- Region: Eastern Norway
- County: Telemark
- District: Aust-Telemark
- Municipality: Notodden Municipality
- Elevation: 195 m (640 ft)
- Time zone: UTC+01:00 (CET)
  - Summer (DST): UTC+02:00 (CEST)
- Post Code: 3691 Gransherad

Tinnoset is a village in Notodden Municipality in Telemark county, Norway. The village is located at the southernmost end of the large lake Tinnsjå, where the river Tinnelva begins flowing south out of the lake. It is about 15 kilometres (9.3 mi) south of the village of Rudsgrendi, about 4 kilometres (2.5 mi) north of the village of Gransherad, and about 20 kilometres (12 mi) to the west of the village of Bolkesjø.

== Transportation ==
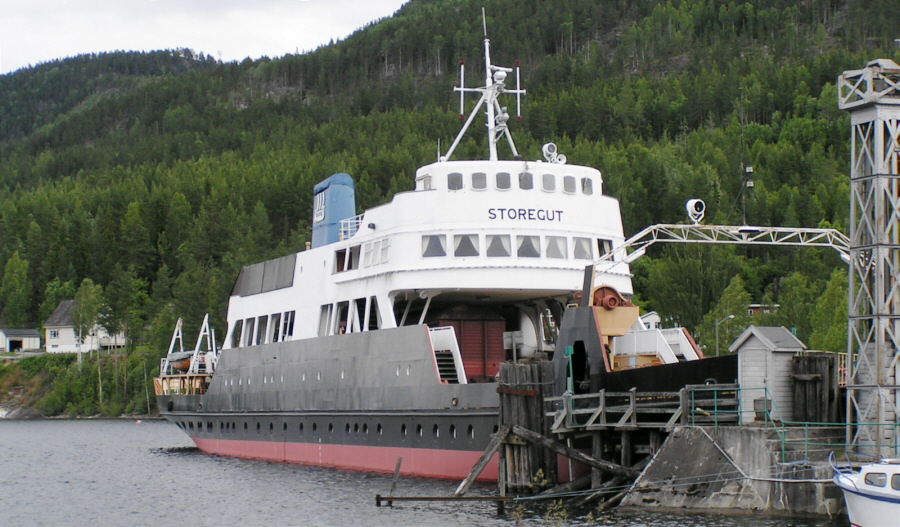
MF Storegut docked at Tinnoset

Tinnoset Station is the terminus of the Tinnoset Line, a 30 kilometres (19 mi) long railway line that went from Tinnoset to the town of Notodden. Tinnoset Station was located adjacent to the docks at the south end of lake Tinnsjå. From 1909 until 1991, these docks connected the Tinnsjø railway ferry system to the Tinnoset Line in the south. The railway ferry service crossed the lake and connected to the Rjukan Line and on to the town of Rjukan.

== See also ==
- Mæl Station
