= SF Rjukanfoss =

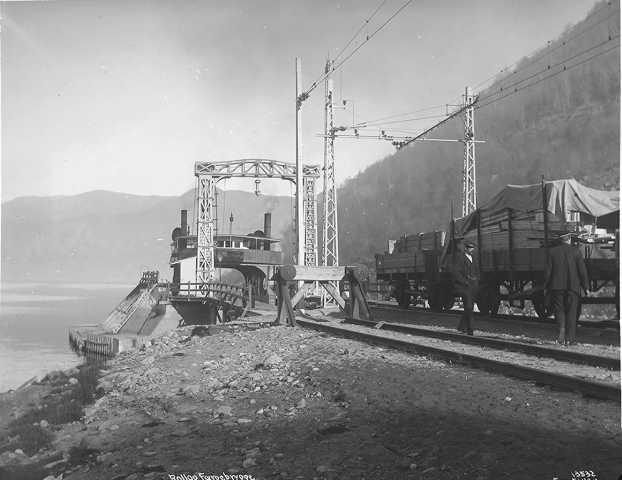
- Rjukanfos docket at Mæl in 1911.

History
- Name: D/F Rjukanfoss
- Owner: Norsk Transport
- Operator: Norsk Transport
- Port of registry: Norway
- Route: Tinnsjø railway ferry
- Builder: Fevig Jernskibsbyggeri
- Cost: NOK 313,145
- Launched: 1909
- Out of service: 1969

General characteristics
- Class & type: 1.A.1.I
- Tonnage: 684 gross
- Length: 69 meters (225 ft)
- Beam: 10 meters (32 ft)
- Depth: 3 m (10 ft)
- Installed power: 2× 340 kW steam engines
- Speed: 14 knots
- Capacity: 250 passengers; 16 cars; 550 tonnes

D/F Rjukanfoss, prior to 1946 named Rjukanfos, was a steam-powered railway ferry that operated between Mæl and Tinnoset on the Lake Tinn, Norway. Owned by Norsk Transport, she was launched in 1909, expanded in 1946 and decommissioned in 1969.

== Specifications ==
Rjukanfos was the first ferry delivered to Norsk Transport for the Tinnsjø railway ferry service. Built by Fevig Jernskibsbyggeri in 1908–09, she was delivered 43 meters (142 ft) long, at 338 gross register tons. There were two parallel standard gauge tracks down the length of the ship, in total 66.6 metres (219 ft), with a single track for loading at the front. The nine railway wagons could hold 240 tonnes, in addition to 120 passengers. She was equipped with two 150 kW (200 hp) steam engines, and capable of 9 knots.

She was rebuilt in 1945–46, changing her name to Rjukanfoss. She was lengthened to 69 meters (225 ft), at 684 gross register tons. The trackage was lengthened to 120 metres (390 ft) allowing 550 tonnes cargo in 16 cars, and the number of passengers increased to 250. Two new engines were installed, each at 340 kW (450 hp) and automatic coal feeding, giving her a lower coal consumption than SF Ammonia.
