= Mæl Station =

Railway station in Tinn, Norway

Mæl
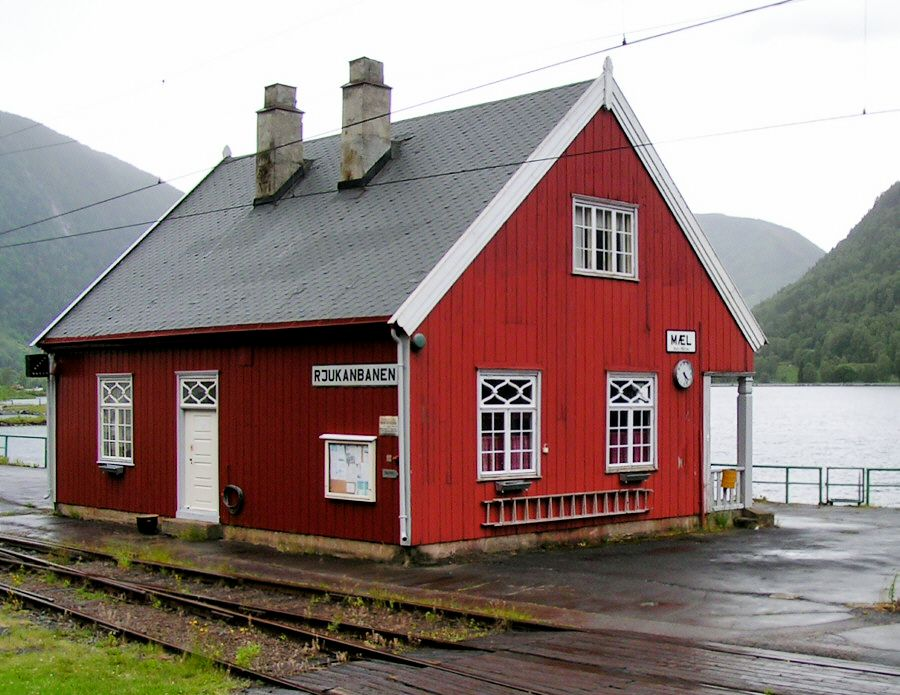

General information
- Location: Mæl, Tinn Municipality; Norway
- Coordinates: 59°55′46″N 8°48′39″E
- Elevation: 191.8 m (629 ft)
- Operator: Norsk Transport
- Line: Rjukan Line
- Platforms: 1
- Connections: Ferry: Tinnsjø railway ferry

Construction
- Architect: Thorvald Astrup

History
- Opened: 8 August 1909
Location

Mæl Station (Norwegian: Mæl stasjon) is a railroad station located at Tinn Municipality in Telemark, Norway. It is the terminus of the Rjukan Line (Rjukanbanen) running through Vestfjorddalen between Mæl and Rjukan. The station is located 16 km from Rjukan and on the mouth of the river Måna in Vestfjorddalen where the river runs into Lake Tinn. This was the point where the railway cars on the line were transferred to the Tinnsjø railway ferry for transport to the Tinnoset Line.

== History ==
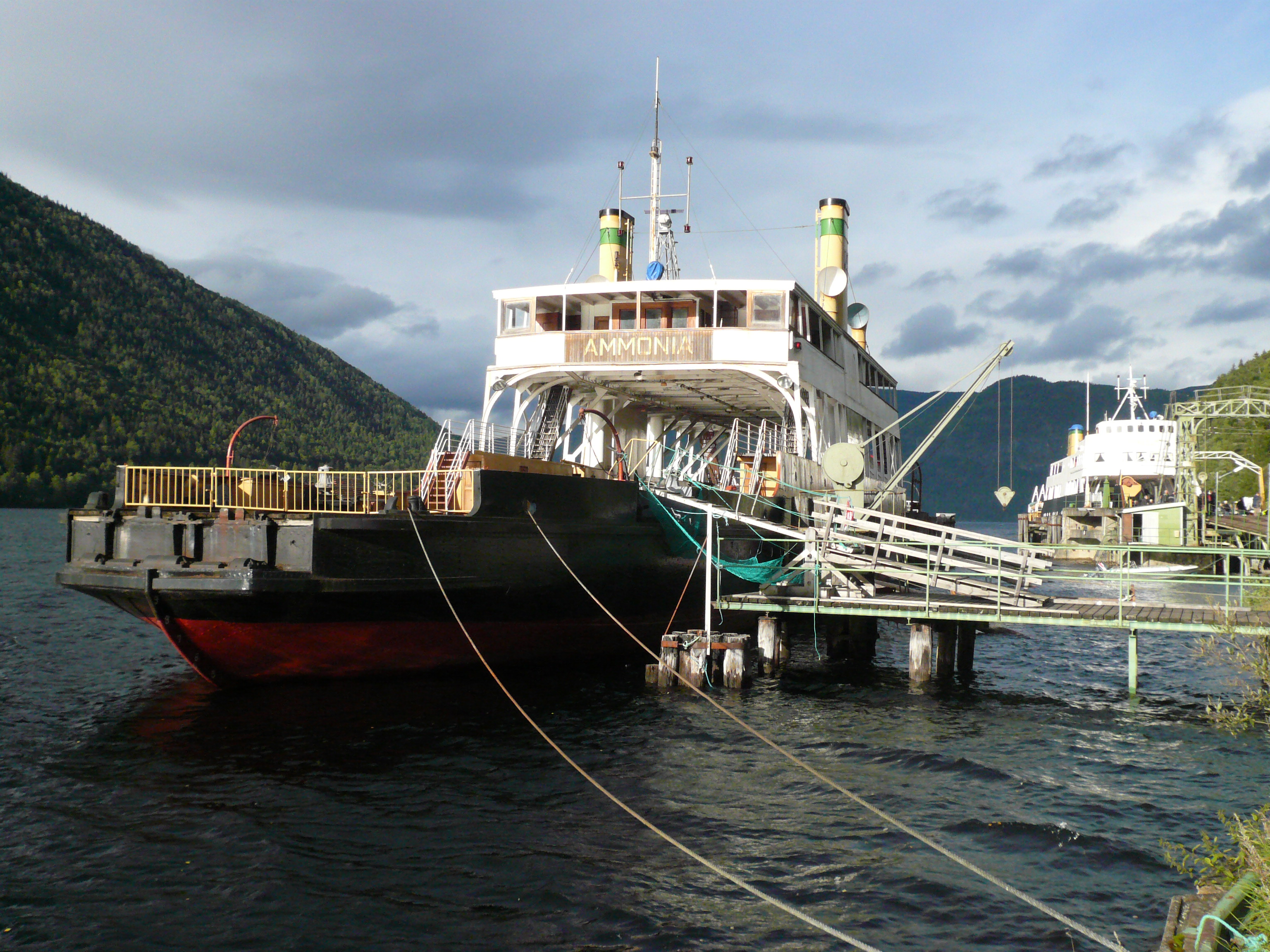
DF Ammonia at Mæl

Mæl Station was constructed based upon designs by architect, Thorvald Astrup. The station was built in 1909 when the Rjukan Line opened and was electrified in 1911. A new station building was constructed in 1917; it was named Rollag until 1921 when it had to change name because of the connection to the national railway network—there was already Rollag Station on the Numedal Line.

After traffic on the Rjukan Line declined, the railway was closed in 1991. It was kept as a heritage railway and the foundation Stiftelsen Rjukanbanen was established to ensure that the railway remained in an operational condition. In 1993, Mæl Station was renovated and there is now an information center in the building. Mæl is a point of entry for boats which operate tours during the summer months. The former ferry boat DF Ammonia is docked at Mæl and is currently used as a stationary museum.

== See also ==
- MF Storegut

== Other sources ==
- Payton, Gary & Lepperød, Trond (1995). Rjukanbanen på sporet av et industrieventyr. Rjukan: Maana Forlag. ISBN 9788299354936.
