= Herøya =

Peninsula in Telemark, Norway

- Peninsula
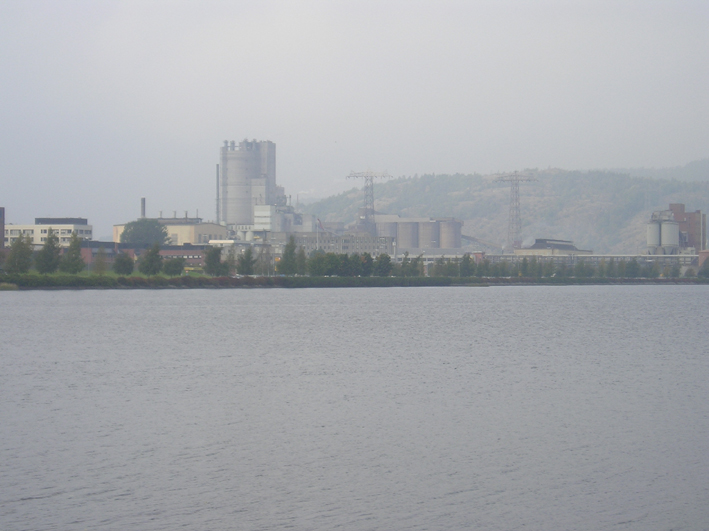
- Norsk Hydro industry park on Herøya
- Interactive map of Herøya
- Coordinates: 59.12037°N 9.62876°E
- Location: Telemark, Norway
- Water bodies: Gunnekleivsfjorden, Porsgrunn river, Frierfjorden

Area
  - Total: 1.5 square kilometres (0.58 sq mi)

Herøya is a peninsula in Porsgrunn Municipality in Telemark county, Norway. It is located between the fjords of Frierfjord to the west and Gunnekleivfjord to the east, at the mouth of Porsgrunn River. The name stems from the Old Norse word "her-eyjar" meaning an island (øya) with a horde or army (her), thus "the crowded island".

The peninsula features a large industrial park that was founded in 1928 and contains major facilities of Norsk Hydro, Yara. REC (ScanWafer subsidiary) said in 2023 that the company is closing down its operations in Norway.

The area is served by the Bratsberg Line. About 2,700 people work on the 1.5 square kilometres (0.58 sq mi) peninsula that has about 30 companies, most of which are subsidiaries of Norsk Hydro, including Hydro's research park with 350 employees. A populated area south of the peninsula itself, which was initially housing for the Hydro employees, is also considered part of Herøya as a suburb of the city of Porsgrunn.

Herøya also has a local football club, participating in the Norwegian 5th division. The club stadium, Herøya Stadion, has a capacity in surplus of 2000.

== History ==
Originally an island that was used for agriculture, in 1928 Norsk Hydro decided to locate a new artificial fertilizer factory there, Hydro Porsgrunn, and in just 16 months both this factory and a shipping port for Norwegian saltpeter (calcium nitrate) were built. In the process, the narrow sound between the island and the mainland was mostly filled up, thus transforming the island to a peninsula. The reason Hydro wanted to establish itself in the Grenland region was the proximity to limestone, one of the necessary components in the fertilizer, Calcium nitrate. Norsk Hydro had previously had to build its fertilizer plants in Notodden (in 1907) and Rjukan (in 1909) because technology at that time didn't allow for efficient transport of electricity long distances from the power plants to the place of use. But in the 1920s technology had developed and it was possible to locate the plants close to the natural resources instead of close to the hydro electric power plants, that were located in the mountains in Northern Telemark.

Another important function was the establishment of a port for the export of fertilizer from Norsk Hydro's plants in Telemark. The Telemark Canal had been used for transport from Notodden from the start of operations there, while a railway, Rjukanbanen, had been built to the plant in Rjukan to Notodden. In 1916 this railway was extended as the Bratsberg Line to Skien, and then to Herøya when it opened, replacing the need for the canal. Since then there has been opened other plants at Herøya, including a production plant for PVC (in 1951).

Following the occupation of Norway by Nazi Germany in April 1940 the German occupying force had plans to build aluminium and magnesium plants in Herøya. The construction of the plant by Norsk Hydro in partnership with the Luftwaffe-operated Nordische Aluminium Aktiengesellschaft (Nordag) was however ended on 24 July 1943, when a bombardment by American B-17 Flying Fortresses completely destroyed the facilities as well as hitting parts of the surrounding areas, killing 55 people, including civilians. Later, in the 1950s, Hydro would take up these plans and build a magnesium factory, which was rebuilt in 2002 to a metal recycling facility.

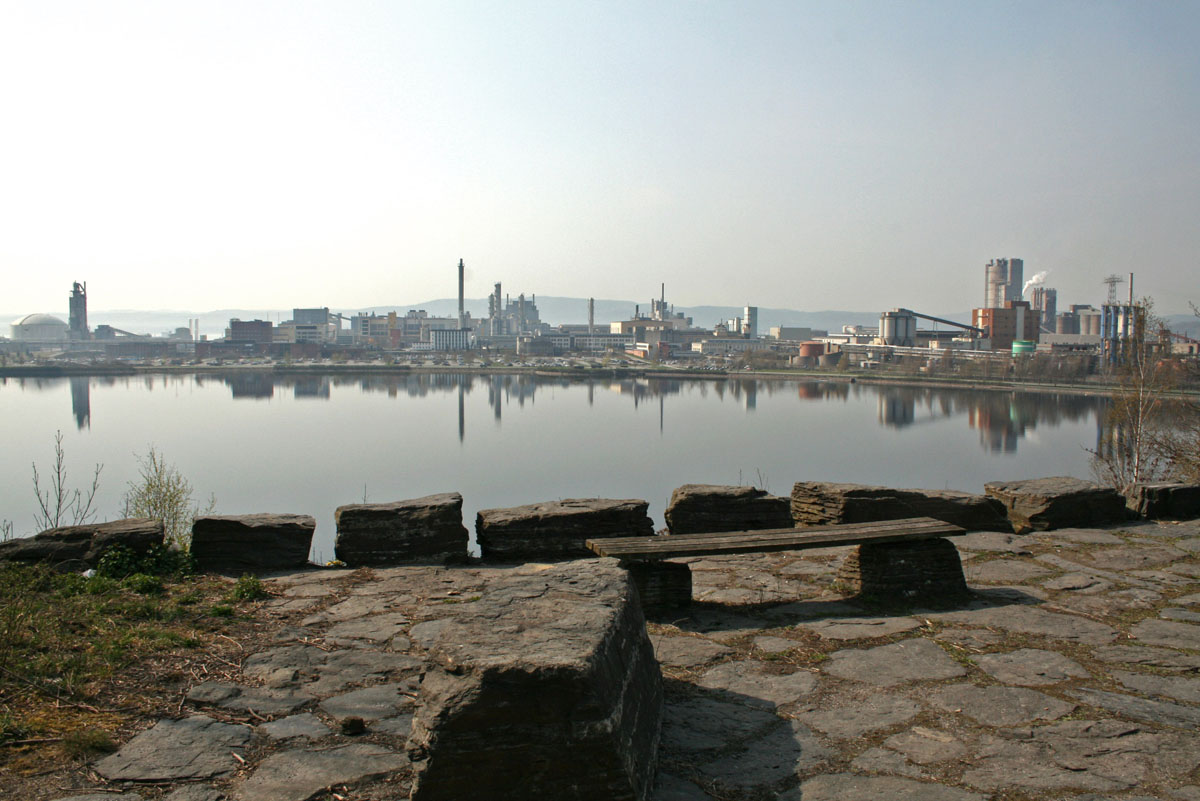
A view of Herøya industry park from Porsgrunn

=== Post-WWII Herøya ===
In the reminiscing book UT. Fra en oppvekst i forrige århundre by historian Harald Berntsen, portrayals are given of incidents and milieus in Herøya, from the time when his family moved there in 1951 (from downtown Porsgrunn), just before he was to begin school, and until 1960. The book explains among other things the way in which the different residential areas in Herøya were related to status and hierarchy in the Hydro community. Berntsen's family lived in a flat on Torggata, on the peninsula proper, to the west of the Gunneklevfjord, in a recently built 4-flat house which the father had been given by Hydro.

=== Torggata ===
"On both sides of Torggata up on the right, one 'owned home' after the other, within well-groomed gardens fenced in with chain link fences and gates ... In front of the residence and down on the left, Torggata has recently been elevated and graveled, but not yet asphalted. On the other side of the street, the Germans have left a long two-storey barrack ... On both sides of Torggata down on the left, endless open yards with grass and weeds, thistles and nettles. The yards end in a fertile belt of tall, wavering rushes with a forest of brown cigars on the top, in front of the enclosed Gunneklevfjord, glittering in the sun in all hues of pollution. On the left side of the fjord Hydro's factory buildings tower proudly, in particular the tallest round tower which day and night pumps out the thick, yellow smoke which always gives the wind strength and direction." (Berntsen, pp. 72) The barrack being described would soon be demolished to provide room for a community house.

Up Torggata, to the right and into the forest, one would arrive at the beach of the Frierfjord where boats lay waiting outside Hydro, "and where we could make out the contours of Herre and the cellulose plant from which the fart-like Herre smell would come."

The workers lived, among other places, on the eastside of Kirkehaugen in "owned homes". The engineers lived in the "'engineer town' consisting of villas with spacious gardens having been situated facing the still idyllic Frierfjord, closest to the factories, when Hydro's plant on Herøya grew from 1928 on. Or they would occupy the row of Hydro's more elegant one-family houses for engineers at Bakkedammen and, in a few cases, the grand workers' villas in Adriansåsen, the hill atop Herøya. Or increasingly in Hefalia, which lay on the opposite side of the factories, between Herøya and Porsgrunn."
