= Tinnsjå =

Lake in Telemark, Norway

- Tinnsjø / Tinnsjøen (unofficial)
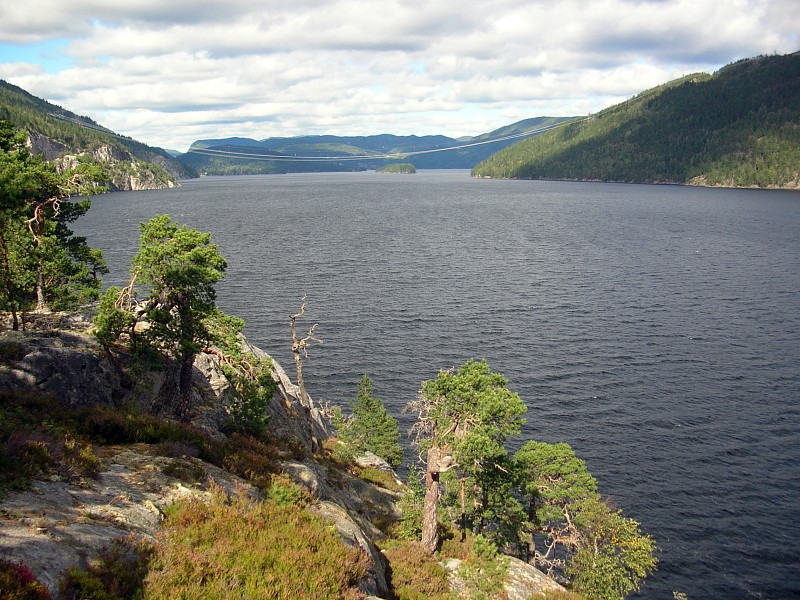
- View of the lake
- Interactive map of Tinnsjå
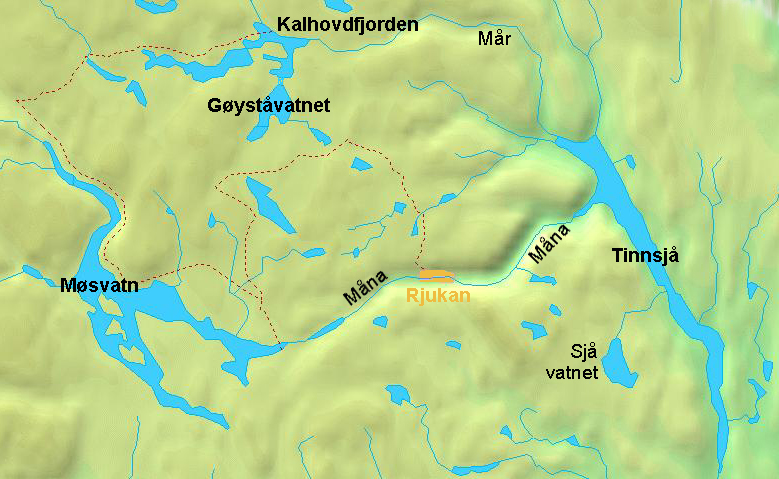
- Tinnsjå's primary sources are Måna and Mår
- Location: Tinn Municipality, Telemark
- Coordinates: 59.97612°N 8.81542°E
- Type: glacial fjord lake
- Primary inflows: Måna, Austbygdåe, Digeråi, Gjuvåi, Gøyst, Mår, Raua, Rollagåe, Skirva and Urdalsåe
- Primary outflows: Tinnelva
- Catchment area: 3,775.23 km^{2} (1,457.62 sq mi)
- Basin countries: Norway
- Max. length: 35 km (22 mi)
- Max. width: 2.4 km (1.5 mi)
- Surface area: 51.38 km^{2} (19.84 sq mi)
- Average depth: 190 m (620 ft)
- Max. depth: 460 m (1,510 ft)
- Water volume: 9.762 km^{3} (2.342 cu mi)
- Surface elevation: 187–191 m (614–627 ft)
- Islands: Galten, Langøy and Vesleøy
- References: Seppälä; NVE

Tinnsjå (lit. 'Lake Tinn') is one of the largest lakes in Norway measuring about 51.38 km^{2} (19.84 sq mi). At a depth of 460 m (1,510 ft) it is the third deepest lake in Norway and Europe. Tinnsjå is located in Tinn Municipality and Notodden Municipality in Telemark county. At its source in the west, the Måna river flows out of the lake Møsvatn and past the town of Rjukan into Tinnsjå. From the north, the river Mår flows from the lakes Mår, Gøystavatn, and Kalhovdfjorden into Tinnsjå. Tinnsjå is part of the Skien watershed, and it drains via the Tinnåa river in the south, down to the lake Heddalsvatnet.

At the north end of the lake lie the villages of Atrå and Austbygdi. The village of Miland lies on the western shore of the lake. The village of Hovin lies up on a hill overlooking the eastern shore of the lake and the village of Rudsgrendi lies on the western shore. There is a small dam at the south end of the lake which regulates the surface elevation of the lake and the village of Tinnoset is located at this end of the lake. The village of Gransherad lies about 4 km (2.5 mi) south of this dam.

== History ==
In 1944, during the German occupation of Norway, the ferry SF Hydro was sunk in Tinnsjå by the Norwegian resistance. The Germans were using the ferry to transport a large quantity of heavy water to Germany, where it was to be used for nuclear weapons research. The heavy water had been produced at Vemork, a factory located in Rjukan.

The wreck of the ferry was discovered in 1993. In 2004, it was investigated and filmed for an episode of NOVA; heavy water samples were recovered and deuterium isotopic enrichment was confirmed.

In 2004, a film crew shooting footage for a new documentary on the heavy water sabotage became aware of an unusual fish, swimming near the lake bottom at a depth of 430 metres (1,410 ft). Two specimens of the previously unknown fish were captured in April 2005. Analysis revealed the fish to be closely related to Arctic char. The light-colored, translucent fish is up to 15 centimetres (5.9 in) long and lacks a swim bladder.

== See also ==
- List of lakes in Norway
