= List of discontinued railway stations in Norway =

List of discontinued railway stations located in Norway

This is a list of the discontinued railway stations located in Norway.

Name	Location (city, town, village)	Year of closure	Image	Extra info
A
Ådalsbruk Station	Ådalsbruk; Innlandet	1972		
Årlifoss Station	Notodden; Telemark	1991		
Åsåker Station	Asker; Akershus	2012		
Alnabru Station	Alnabru; Oslo	1971		
Askim Næringspark Station	Askim; Østfold	2012		
B
Bestun Station	Ullern; Oslo	1978		
Bjørgeseter Station	Lunner; Akershus	2006		
Bjørnevatn Station	Bjørnevatn; Finnmark	2015?		
Borgestad Station	Borgestad; Telemark	2006		
Brevik Station	Brevik; Telemark	1982		
Byglandsfjord Station	Byglandsfjord; Agder	1962		
D
Dilling Station	Rygge; Østfold	1983		
Drømtorp Station	Ski; Akershus	2012		
E
Eidanger Station	Eidanger; Telemark	1987		
Eikonrød Station				
Elisenberg station				
Elnes Station				
F
Fåberg Station				
Flekkefjord Station				
Flornes Station				
G
Gransherad Station	Gransherad; Telemark	1991		
Granvin Station	Granvin; Vestland	1989		
Grønvollfoss Station	Notodden; Telemark	1991		
H
Harestua Station	Tinn; Telemark	2012		
Hjuksebø Station	Sauherad; Telemark	????		
Holmestrand Private Station	Holmestrand; Vestfold	1938		Demolished (?)
Horten Station (1881)	Horten; Vestfold	1967		Burned down
I
Ingolfsland Station	Tinn; Telemark	1970		
J
Jåttå Station	Stavanger; Rogaland	2008		
Jong Station	Bærum; Oslo	1993		
K
Kampenes Station				
Kirkenes Station				
Kraby Station				
Kragerø Station				
Kværner Station				
L
Ladalen Station				
Langli Station				
Langnes Station				
Lisleherad Station				
Løkken Station	Orkland; Trøndelag	1963		
M
Mæl Station	Tinn; Telemark	1991		
Miland Station	Tinn; Telemark	1970		Demolished in 1989
Myra Station	Bærum; Akershus	1973		
N
Notodden New Station				
Notodden Old Station				
Nystrand Station				
O
Oslo West Station				
Osøren Station				
R
Ramstad Station				
Rjukan Station				
Rossedalen Station				
Rudskogen Motorsenter Station				
S
Sandermosen Station				
Såner Station				
Skarpsno station				
Snarum Station				
Sona Station				
Strand Station				
Svorkmo Station				
T
Takvam Station				
Thamshavn Station				
Tinnoset Station				
Torbjørnsbu Station				
Trondhjem Kalvskinnet Station	Tronhdeim; Trøndelag	1884		
V
Vist Station	Steinkjer; Trøndelag	1990		

== See also ==
- Rail transport in Norway
- History of rail transport in Norway
- List of railway stations in Norway

== Bibliography ==
- Norwegian Railway Museum (1998). Velkommen til Norsk Jernbanemuseum. Hamar: Norwegian Railway Museum.
- Bjerke, Thor; Holom, Finn (2004). Banedata 2004 (in Norwegian). Hamar / Oslo: Norsk Jernbanemuseum / Norsk Jernbaneklubb. ISBN 82-90286-28-7.
- Payton, Gary & Lepperød, Trond (1995). Rjukanbanen på sporet av et industrieventyr. Rjukan: Maana Forlag. ISBN 82-993549-1-9.
- Wisting, Tor (2002). Høvik Vel 100 år (in Norwegian). Bærum: Høvik Vel.
- Holøs, Bjørn (1990). Stasjoner i sentrum (in Norwegian). Oslo: Gyldendal Norsk Forlag. ISBN 82-05-19082-8.
- Sørensen, Johnny (1995). Breviksbanen (in Norwegian). Brevik: Brevik historielag. ISSN 0333-1377.
- Aspenberg, Nils Carl (1994). Glemte spor: boken om sidebanenes tragiske liv (in Norwegian). Oslo: Baneforlaget. ISBN 82-91448-00-0.
- Bjerke, Thor (1994). Banedata '94 (in Norwegian). Oslo: Norsk Jernbaneklubb. ISBN 82-90286-15-5.
- Broch, Just (1936). Av Norges statsbaners historie: Anleggene gjennom syttiårenes lys inn i åttiårenes mørke (in Norwegian). Vol. 2. Oslo: Cappelen.
- Hartmann, Eivind; Mangset, Øistein; Reisegg, Øyvind (1997). Neste stasjon (in Norwegian). Gyldendal. ISBN 82-05-25294-7.
- Jakobsen, Asbjørn N. (1996). Jernbaneminner fra Vestfold (in Norwegian). Galleberg: A.N. Jakobsen.
