= Hovik =

Hovik or Hovig is an Armenian given name. Høvik with a diacritics and the alternative Hovig is a Scandinavian name.

Hovik, Hovig, or Høvik may refer to:

== Hovig ==
- Hovig Demirjian (born 1989), Armenian Cypriot singer

== Hovik ==
- Hovik Abrahamyan (born 1958), Armenian politician, Speaker of the National Assembly of Armenia, and Prime Minister of Armenia
- Hovik Vardoumian (born 1940), Armenian short story writer and novelist
- Hovik Keuchkerian (born 1972), Spanish-Armenian actor
- Kjell Hovik (born 1937), Norwegian pole vaulter
- Hovik Hayrapetyan Equestrian Centre, an equestrian complex and horse racing hippodrome in Yerevan, Armenia

== Høvik ==
- Høvik, a suburb in the municipality of Bærum, Norway
- Høvik Verk, a district in the municipality of Bærum, Norway
- Høvik Station, a railway station at Høvik, Bærum, Norway

== See also ==
- Hovig, a given name and surname
