= Ramstad =

- District
- Etymology: From a local farm named after Ravn
- Coordinates: 59.89994°N 10.56469°E
- Country: Norway
- City: Bærum

Ramstad is a district in central Bærum, Norway. It is known mainly for its school and a former station on the Drammen Line.

== History, geography and transportation ==
The name Ramstad is based on the men's given name Ravn, meaning raven. It is taken from the local farm, which dates from the Scandinavian Iron Age. As most farms in the region it belonged to the Church of Norway, but the crown usurped the property following the Protestant Reformation. The first private owner was Knud Frantzen in 1668, who at that time owned Nesøygodset. Various owners followed, and in 1772 the farm was parted in two; Upper and Lower Ramstad. The parts were reunited in 1903.

Around the same time, the district was being built up with residences. The owner of Ramstad from 1895, Hans Kristoffer Ramstad, started this process by selling lots between the Drammen Line railway (opened 1872) and the road Drammensveien (now: the European route E18). The road was built in 1859, and cut across the large field named Ramstadsletta, located south of the farm. Today, Ramstadsletta is an area of commerce, and has a large market garden, a gas station and a Scandic Hotel, among other things. Buses traffic the European route E18. The district was also served by the railway station Ramstad on the Drammen Line, which existed between 1931 and 1978 (with no passenger traffic from 1973).

The hill Ramstadåsen north of the farm was built up around 1900 as well. The former cotter's farms are Kokkerud and Nygård, north of the farm, were absorbed in this development. The district south of Ramstadsletta, near the Oslofjord, was sold in 1877 and built up with villas after 1890 under the name Solvik. Now, only the immediate surroundings of the farm Ramstad has been spared from residential and other building.

Reportedly, Josef Terboven tried to confiscate a residence in Solvik in 1940, but gave up since the owner was German-born, and took residence at Skaugum instead.

Before the major residential development, a creek ran southwards through the district. The creek was a part of the Bekkestua Watershed, which originated north of Ringstabekk and ran southwest via Bekkestua (giving this settlement its name), Gjønnesmyra and Ballerud. Parts of the former waterway around Bekkestua were used for Kolsås Line tracks. Near Nybråtan the creek turned more straight southwards. This section of the creek was named Ramstadbekken. At Ramstadsletta there was a confluence with a small creek that ran northwards. From Ramstadsletta it followed a path west and slightly south. A part of this path is identical to the current European route E18, but after passing what is today the market garden it turned more distinctly southwest before reaching its mouth in the Oslofjord at Solvik. Today, the entire Bekkestua Watershed has been led underground through a pipe system.

== Education and sports ==
Ramstad is known to many due to its lower secondary school of the same name. It was erected between 1962 and August 1963, on the property Nybråtan south of Ramstadåsen. Before the school building was finished, pupils were tutored at the schools Gjettum and Blommenholm. Between 1964 and 1972 it was a combined lower and upper secondary school. By 2005 it had 520 pupils and a staff of 65. The school is noted for having an adjacent swimming pool, very uncommon in schools in the region. Ramstad Lower Secondary School serves the districts of Ramstad, Solvik, Høvik, Høvik Verk, Blommenholm, Løkeberg, parts of Haslum, Ekeberg, Gjønnes and Ballerud.

The only local sports club is the gymnastics club Ramstad Turn, founded in 1965. Non-gymnasts tend to practice sports in the multi-sport clubs Høvik IF or Haslum IL.
