= Notodden (disambiguation) =

Notodden may refer to:

== Places ==
- Notodden Municipality, a municipality in Telemark county, Norway
- Notodden (town), a town within Notodden municipality in Telemark county, Norway
- Notodden Church, a church in Notodden Municipality in Telemark county, Norway
- Notodden prestegjeld, a former geographic subdivision of the Church of Norway in Telemark county, Norway
- Notodden Airport, a municipal regional airport in Notodden Municipality in Telemark county, Norway
- Notodden Old Station, a former railway station in Notodden Municipality in Telemark county, Norway
- Notodden New Station, a former railway station in Notodden Municipality in Telemark county, Norway
- Notodden Public Transport Terminal, a railway and bus station in Notodden Municipality in Telemark county, Norway

== Sport ==
- Notodden FK, a Norwegian football club located in Notodden Municipality in Telemark county, Norway
- Notodden Stadion, a sports stadium in Notodden Municipality in Telemark county, Norway
