= Notodden Station =

Notodden Station (Norwegian: Notodden stasjon) may refer to:

- Notodden Old Station, the terminal station of Tinnoset Line between 1909 and 1919.
- Notodden New Station, the railway station for Notodden between 1919 and 2004, and again from 2015 until 2020.
- Notodden Public Transport Terminal, the terminal station of Bratsberg Line between 2004 and 2015, and again from 2020.
