= Bestun station =

Railway station in Bestum, Norway

Bestun
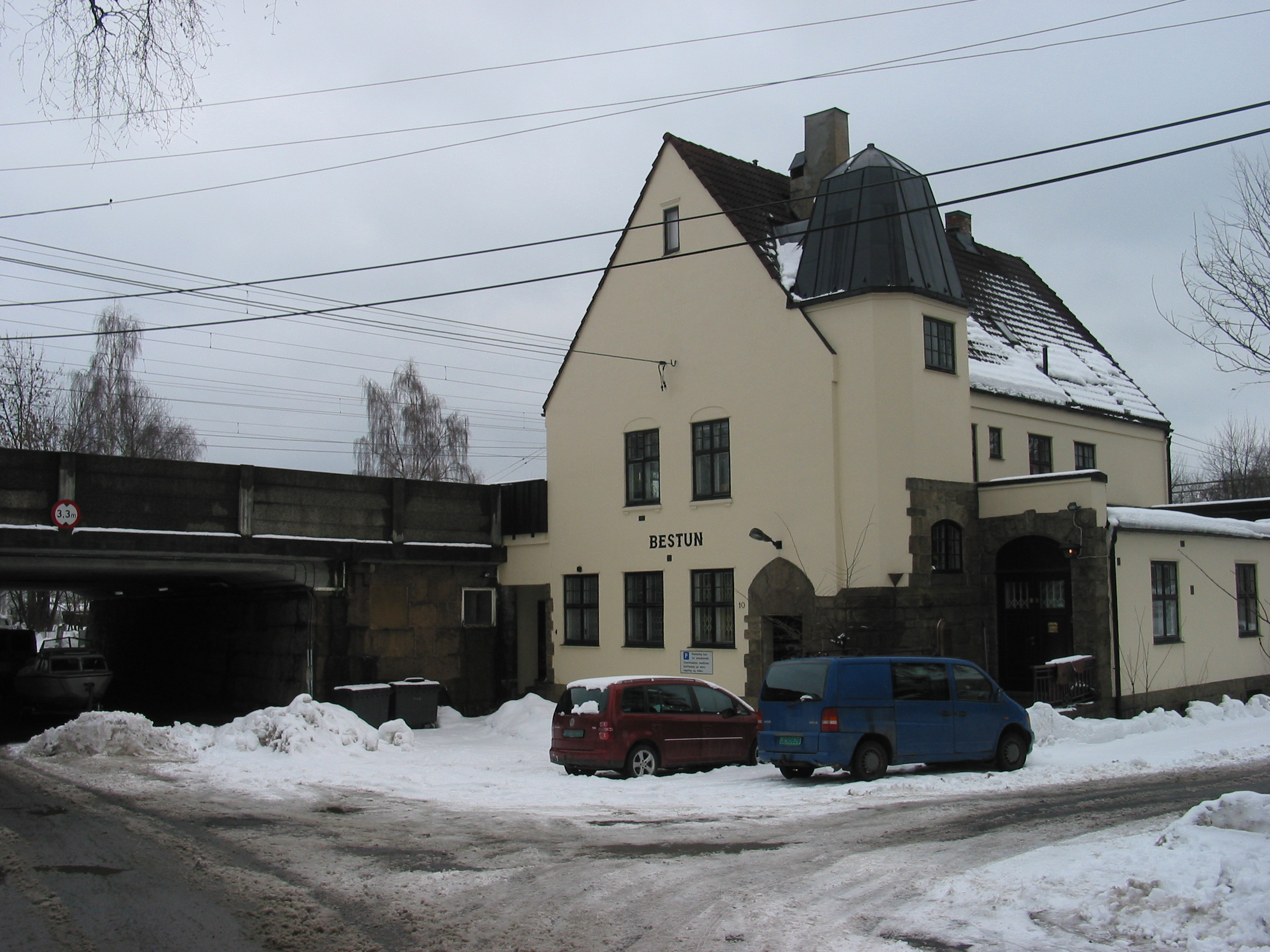

General information
- Location: Bestum, Oslo; Norway
- Coordinates: 59.9203°N 10.6648°E
- Elevation: 24 m (79 ft)
- Owner: Norwegian State Railways
- Line: Drammen Line
- Distance: 4.31 km (2.68 mi) from Oslo V
- Platforms: 1 island platform
- Tracks: 2

Construction
- Architect: Eivind Gleditsch

History
- Opened: 15 July 1884
- Closed: 3 July 1973
- Rebuilt: 1890, 1918
- Electrified: 30 August 1922
Location
- Location within Oslo Location within Norway

Bestun Station (Norwegian: Bestun stasjon) was a railway station situated at Bestum of the Ullern area of Oslo, Norway, on the Drammen Line. The station, located 4.31 kilometers (2.68 mi) from Oslo West Station (Oslo V), was served by Oslo Commuter Rail trains of the Norwegian State Railways.

The station opened as Vækkerø on 15 July 1884. It received a new station building, designed by Paul Due in 1890, and took the name Bestum on 15 August 1890. The third and current station building, designed by Eivind Gleditsch, was completed in 1918. This allowed the station to receive its form as an elevated. The name Bestun was taken into use on 1 September 1922, a week after electric traction and double track had been established past it. The station was one of several closed on 3 July 1973 as part of a service upgrade to speed up local trains on the Drammen Line. Due's station building has been preserved and is on display at the Norwegian Railway Museum.

== History ==
The Drammen Line past the site of Bestun Station opened as a narrow gauge railway on 7 October 1872. Ullern was at the time sparsely populated, so the railway company decided that there would be only one station in the area, situated at Tyskerstranden, now Skøyen Station. However, the road to Tyskerstranden was in poor condition. During the late 1880s and 1890s construction of housing in Bestum accelerated, increasing the basis for patronage. The station opened on 15 July 1884 and was originally named Vækkerø. The first installation was a simple platform with a ticket stand, which was located 4.24 kilometers (2.63 mi) from Oslo V.

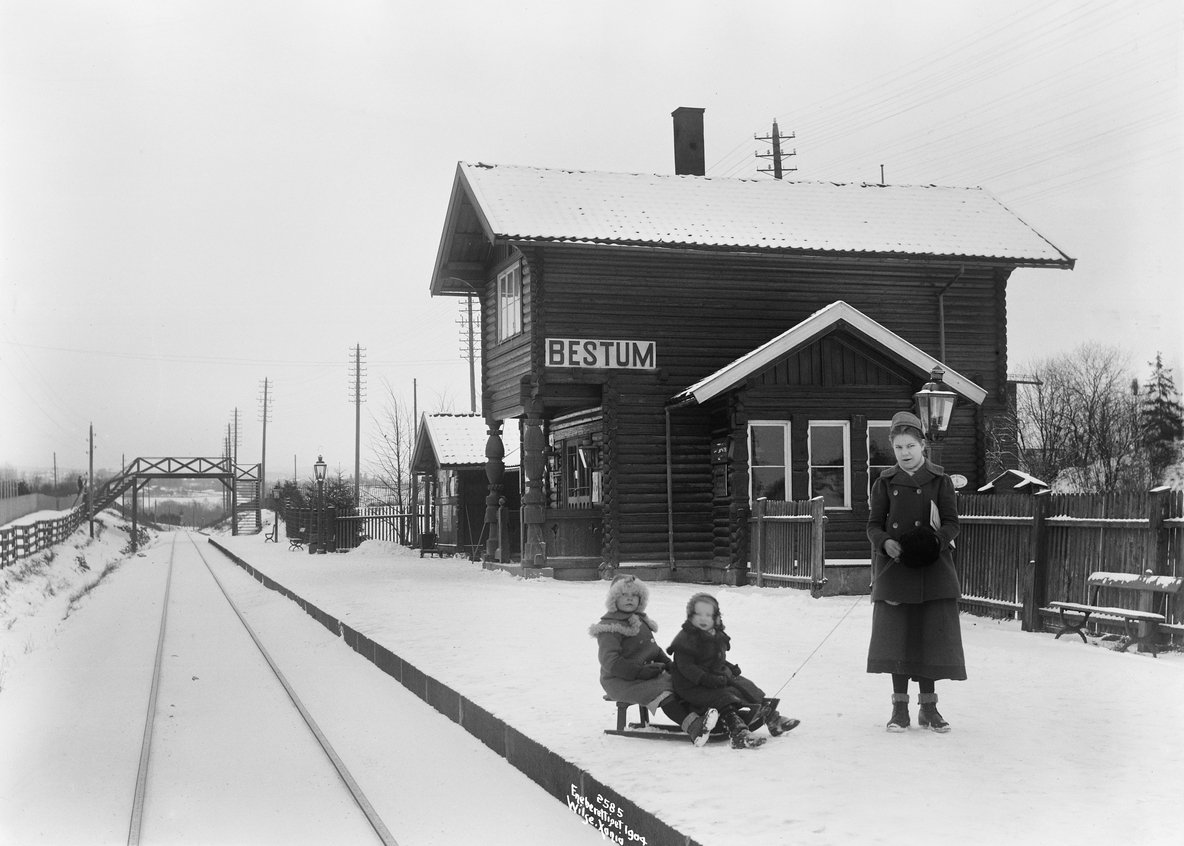
The station in 1904

Bestum lacked any schools at the time, and therefore all school children had to take the train into town. Train services were at first limited with only some trains calling at the station. Especially in the evenings, this was regarded by the residents as a problem, as the last train from Oslo arrived before 20:00. This was later made better by two weekly services calling at Vækkerø at 23:30, allowing the locals to enjoy the city's nightlife. The original kiosk was later moved to Randsfjord Station.

The second station building was completed in 1890 and situated on the southeastern side of the tracks, 70 meters (230 ft) further west. Upon the opening on 15 August, the station changed its name to Bestun. It was designed by Paul Due in a Medieval Romantic style featuring naked, brute lumber walls, giving an impression of a stabbur. It is representative for its style, which was common on the Dovre, Røros and Gjøvik Lines. It is the smallest class of station buildings in Norway to have featured an accommodation. The station has been moved to the Norwegian Railway Museum in Hamar, where it was relocated for the museums opening in 1930.

A new station building, which still stands, was drawn by Eivind Gleditsch of NSB Arkitektkontor and completed in 1918, on the other side of the track and the previous station. This and the other new stations on the Drammen Line were the first stations in Norway designed for double-track operations. Meanwhile, the Norwegian State Railways announced their intention of changing the spelling of the station's name from Bestum to Bestun. This was met by an official protest by the residents' association. The new name was taken into use on 1 September 1922.

The line from Sandvika to Oslo was substantially upgraded between 1917 and 1922. From 27 February 1917 a passing loop was built at Høvik, and standard gauge traffic was carried out on the northern track. A southern track was then built, which was used by narrow gauge trains. However, both were dual gauge. All–standard gauge operations commenced on 9 February 1920, although the dual gauge was not removed until 1922. Electric traction started operation on 30 August 1922. From 1922 station was served every thirty minutes by the Oslo Commuter Rail service between Sandvika Station and Oslo West Station. An interlocking system was installed on 6 October 1924.

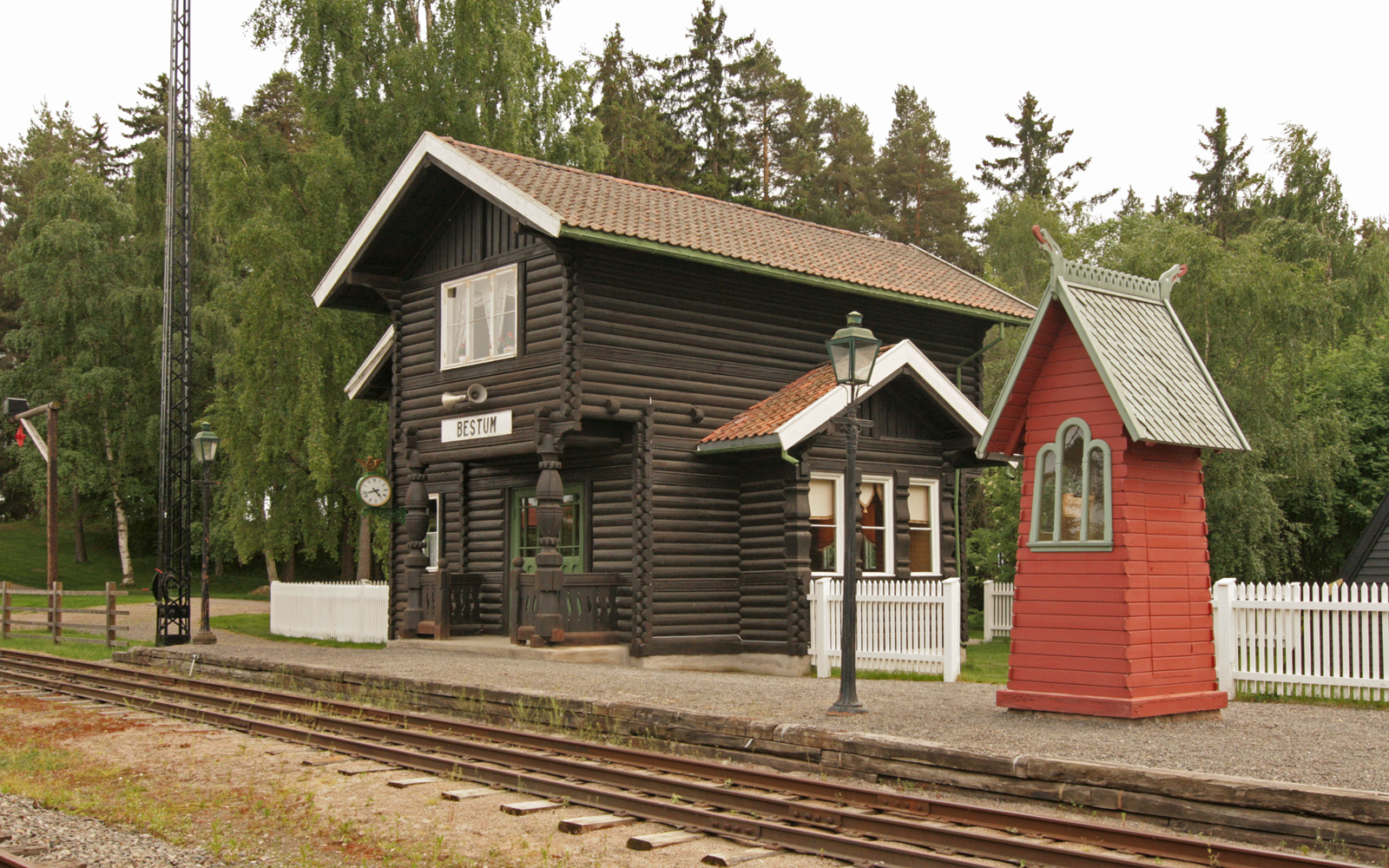
The old station building at the Norwegian Railway Museum with its original name, "Bestum".

During the 1930s, Bestun was proposed as a possible site to build a cross-city freight train tunnel to Grefsen Station on the Gjøvik Line, but the plans were discarded and instead the Oslo Tunnel was built. Bestun became unstaffed on 1 March 1968.

With the opening of the Lieråsen Tunnel, a new route scheme was introduced on the Drammen Line. New and faster Class 69 trains were put into service. To take advantage of this NSB also chose to close four of the stations on the line between Sandvika and Lysaker: Ramstad, Strand, Myra and Bestun. This allowed the local train from Sandvika to Oslo to reduce travel time by ten minutes. Trains stopped calling at Bestun on 3 July 1973, but not until August 1978 was the station officially closed.

== Facilities ==
Bestun Station was situated 4.31 kilometers (2.68 mi) from Oslo West Station, equivalent to 5.3 kilometers (3.3 mi) from Oslo Central Station. It was located at an elevation of 12 meters (39 ft) above mean sea level in the residential neighborhood of Bestum in Ullern. After 1922 the station was located along a section of elevated, double track and electrified line. The station building was, like the other stations between Sandvika and Oslo, designed in Baroque Revival architecture. As the others it featured an island platform. Bestun has close similarities with Skøyen; the brick building featured a steep roof and blunt steeples. Bestun and Skøyen are the only of this style to remain.

The area between Bestun and Skøyen is used for turning trains which terminate at Skøyen. With the completion of the works at Lysaker Station in 2014, the use of these tracks will be significantly reduced, as all trains serving Skøyen will instead continue to Lysaker. The facilities consist of six tracks and also allow access to the Skøyen–Filipstad Line.

== Bibliography ==
- Bjerke, Thor; Holom, Finn (2004). Banedata 2004 (in Norwegian). Hamar / Oslo: Norsk Jernbanemuseum / Norsk Jernbaneklubb. ISBN 82-90286-28-7.
- Hartmann, Eivind; Mangset, Øistein; Reisegg, Øyvind (1997). Neste stasjon (in Norwegian). Gyldendal. ISBN 82-05-25294-7.
- Holøs, Bjørn (1990). Stasjoner i sentrum (in Norwegian). Oslo: Gyldendal Norsk Forlag. ISBN 82-05-19082-8.
- Lindemann, Hans (1986). Blommenhol vel 1911–1986 (in Norwegian). Bærum: Blommenholm Vel.
- Norwegian National Rail Administration (2009). Kapasitet Oslo S – Lysaker (PDF) (in Norwegian).
- Norwegian Railway Museum (1998). Velkommen til Norsk Jernbanemuseum. Hamar: Norwegian Railway Museum.
- Udseth, K. Quale (1948). Bestum. Oslo: Bestum Vel.
- Wisting, Tor (2002). Høvik Vel 100 år (in Norwegian). Bærum: Høvik Vel.

Preceding station		Following station
Skøyen	Drammen Line	Lysaker
