= Gransherad =

Gransherad may refer to:

== Places ==
- Gransherad Municipality, a former municipality in Telemark county, Norway
- Gransherad (village), a village in Notodden Municipality in Telemark county, Norway
- Gransherad Church, a church in Notodden Municipality in Telemark county, Norway
- Gransherad Station, a railway station in Notodden Municipality in Telemark county, Norway
- Gransherad prestegjeld, a former geographic subdivision of the Church of Norway in Telemark county, Norway
