= Strand, Akershus =

District in Bærum, Norway

Coordinates: 59.8997°N 10.5952°E

Strand is a district in Bærum, Norway. Mainly a residential area, it is also known as a marine recreational site, owing to its proximity to the Oslofjord.

== History ==
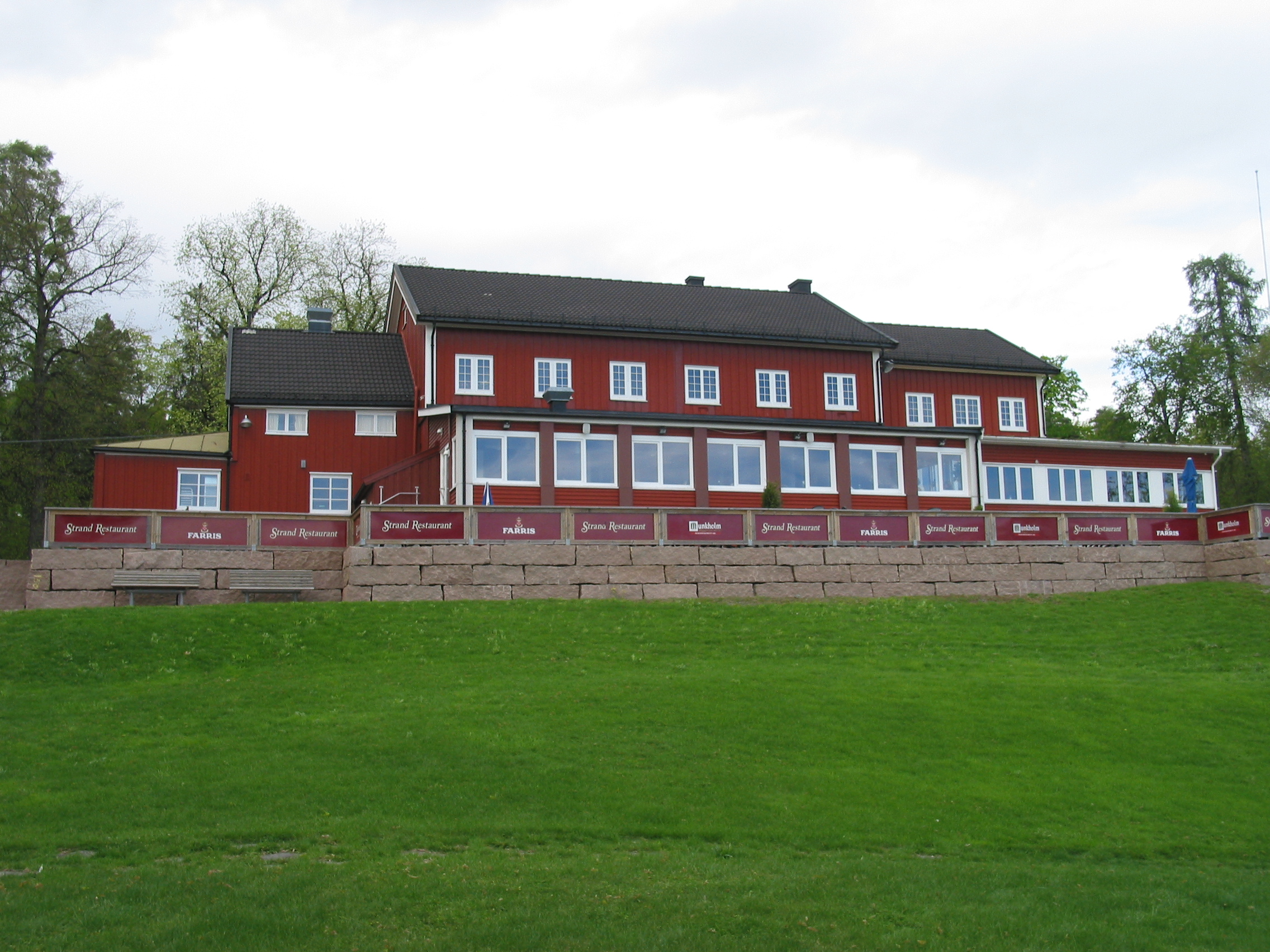
Strand Restaurant.

The district is located west of Stabekk and Fornebulandet and east of Høvik. To the south is Holtekilen, an arm of the Oslofjord. It has its name from the cotter's farm Strandbakken, which for many years belonged to the farm Store Stabekk. In 1886 Strandbakken was bought by barrister Henrik Homan, who built a villa there. The villa was bought by Bærum municipality in 1924, and became the well-known Strand Restaurant. The surrounding area was developed into a park (Strandparken) and a small boat harbor. Strand Restaurant is currently administered by the sailing club Bærum SF. Boat traffic to nearby islands was discontinued in the 1960s. The canoeing club Strand KK, founded 1936, has its name from the district, but today their base is at Høvik. A small tennis club founded in 1975, Strand TK, is based in Strandparken.

The area north of Strand Restaurant was parcelled out in the early twentieth century, and was mostly built with villas. At eastern Strand, near Holtet farm, the Stabekk river emptied into Holtekilen. Today, most of the Stabekk Watershed has been led underground through a pipe system, and the waterway is no longer visible. In the early 2000s the district has been subject a number of controversial building cases.

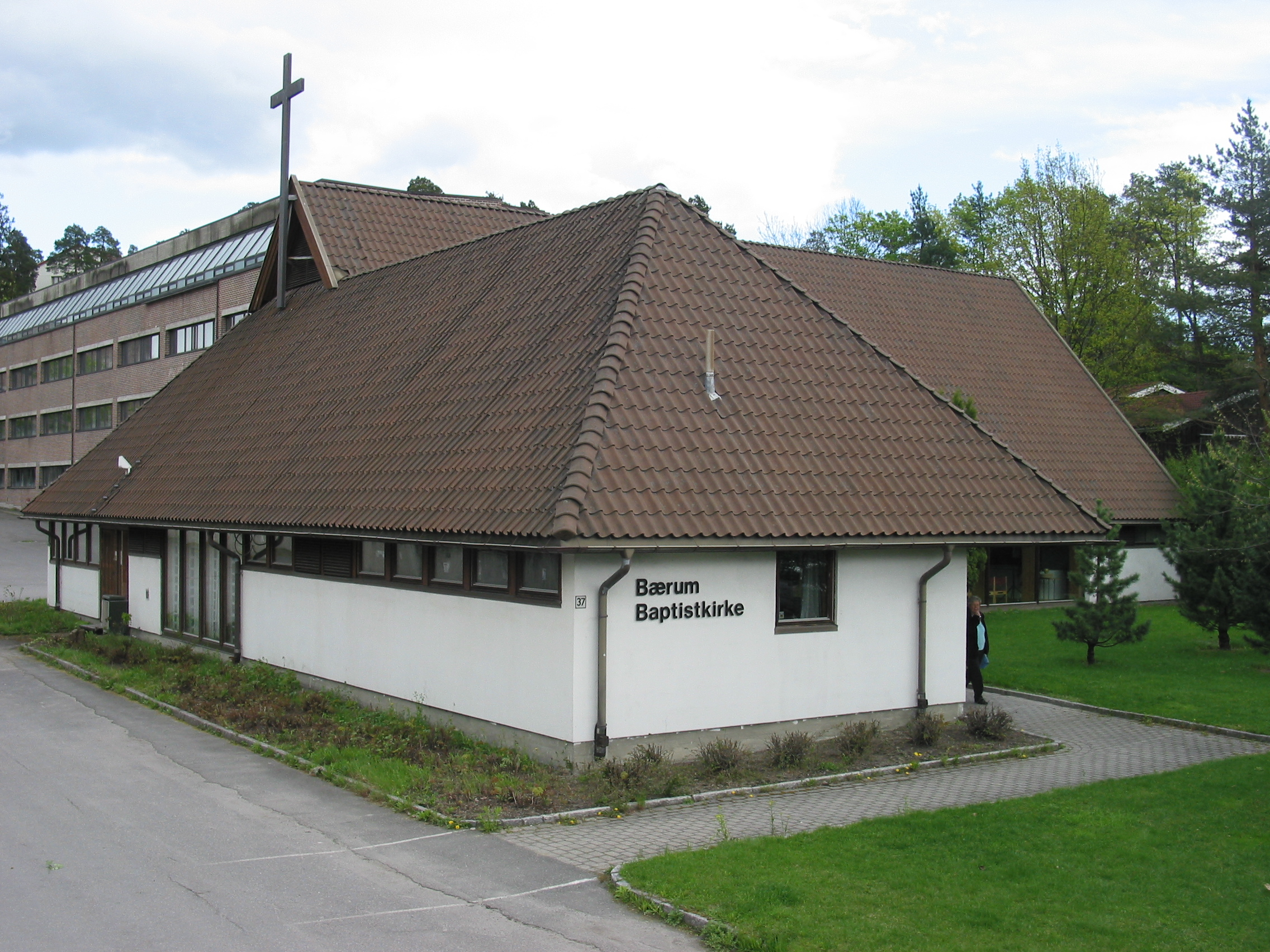
The Baptist church.

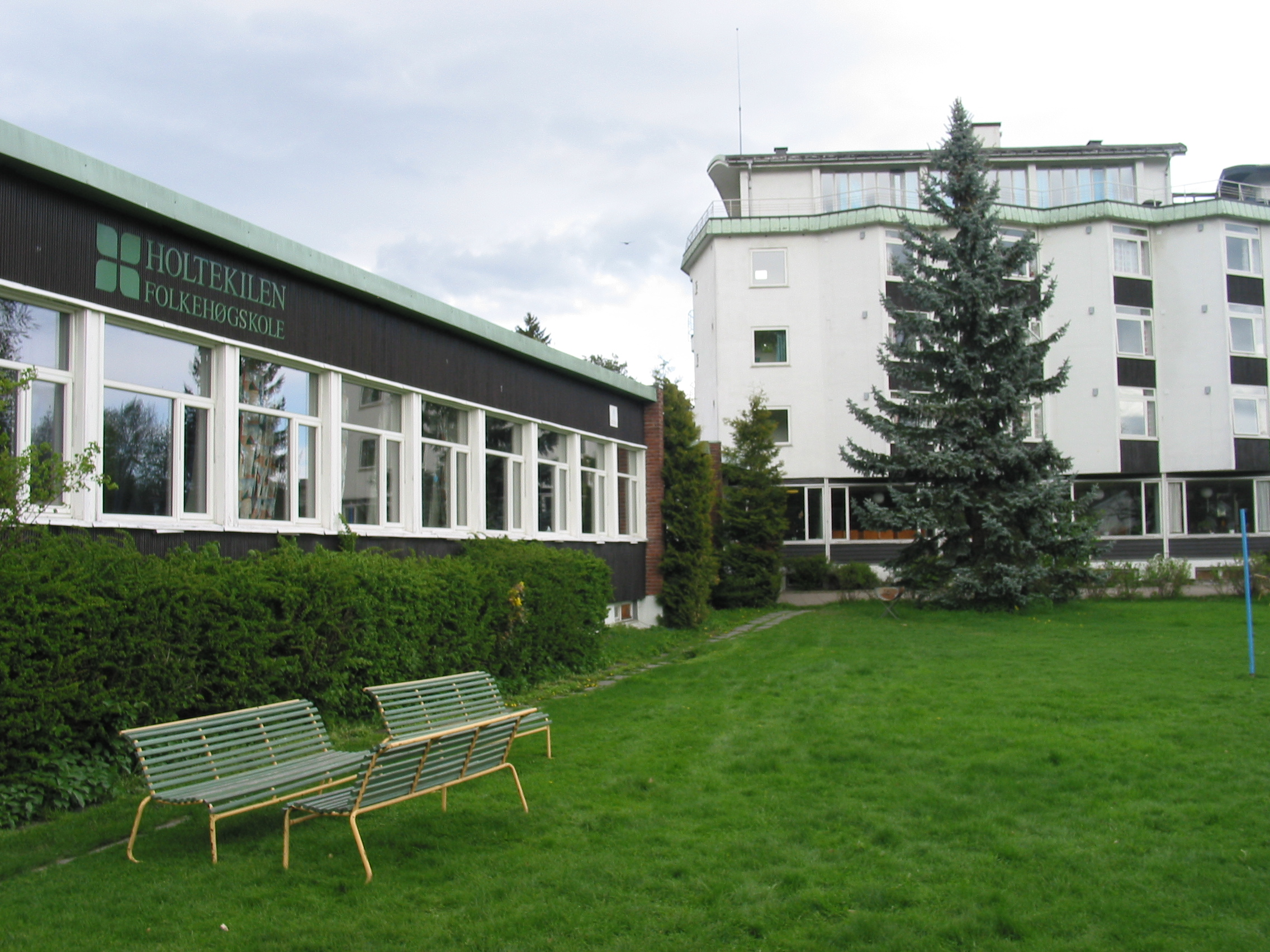
The folk high school.

The regional Baptist Theological Seminary was established near Holtet in 1958, and the baptist community also established Holtekilen folk high school in the same year. The school was visited by Nobel Peace Prize laureate Martin Luther King Jr. in 1964. A Baptist church is also located there.

== Transportation ==
Strand had its own railway station on the Drammen Line, Strand Station, inaugurated in 1931. From want of a more effective train service, passenger traffic from Strand Station ceased in 1973, and the station was closed altogether in 1978. The northern part of the district is featured by the European route E18 highway, which cuts through the area. A bus station Strand on E18 is served by lines 151 and 169 the Ruter bus network.
