= Hovig =

Hovig is a given name and a surname. It may refer to:

== Given name ==
- Hovig Demirjian or just Hovig, Greek Cypriot singer who represented Cyprus in Eurovision Song Contest 2017

== Middle name ==
- John Hovig Dolmayan, Lebanese-born Armenian–American songwriter and musician, best known as the drummer of System of a Down.

== Surname ==
- Andrea Bræin Hovig (born 1973), Norwegian actress
- Geir Hovig (1944–2009), Norwegian radio host
- Ingrid Espelid Hovig (1924–2018), Norwegian television chef and author of cook books
- Jan Inge Hovig (1920–1977), Norwegian architect
- Ole Torstein Hovig, member of the Norwegian pop-rock band Ludvig Moon
- Torstein Hovig (1928–2015), Norwegian pathologist

== See also ==
- Hovik (disambiguation)
