= Bestum =

Norwegian neighborhood

Coordinates: 59°55′13″N 10°39′32″E

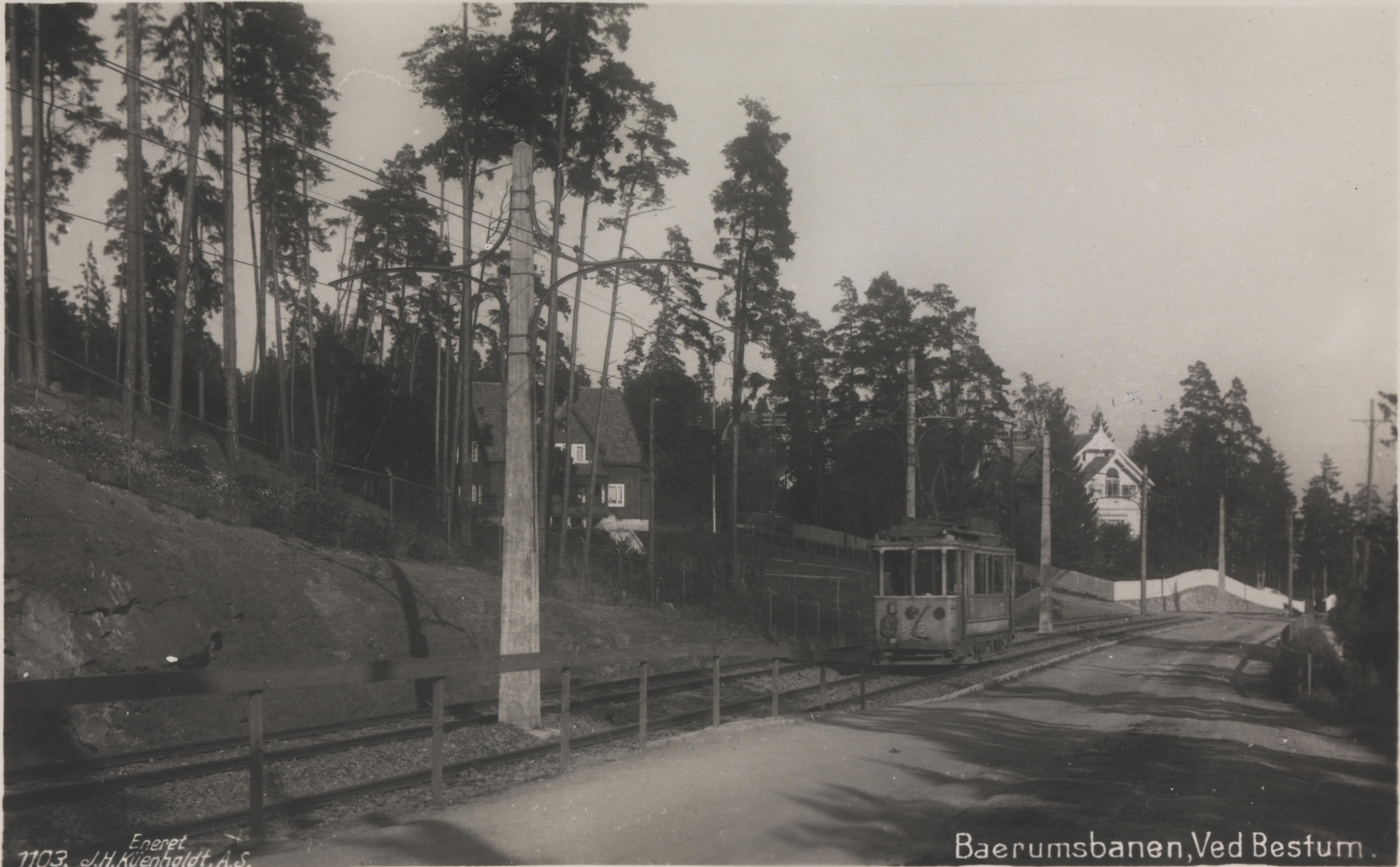

Bestum is a neighbourhood in Ullern in Oslo, Norway. Before the residential area arose, Bestum was mainly an agricultural area. The name origins from the Middle Ages. Bestum was served by a station named "Bestun" and the tram stop Bestum, but both are now closed. The residential houses in the area are drawn in Swiss chalet style.
