= Blommenholm Station =

Railway station in Bærum, Norway

Blommenholm
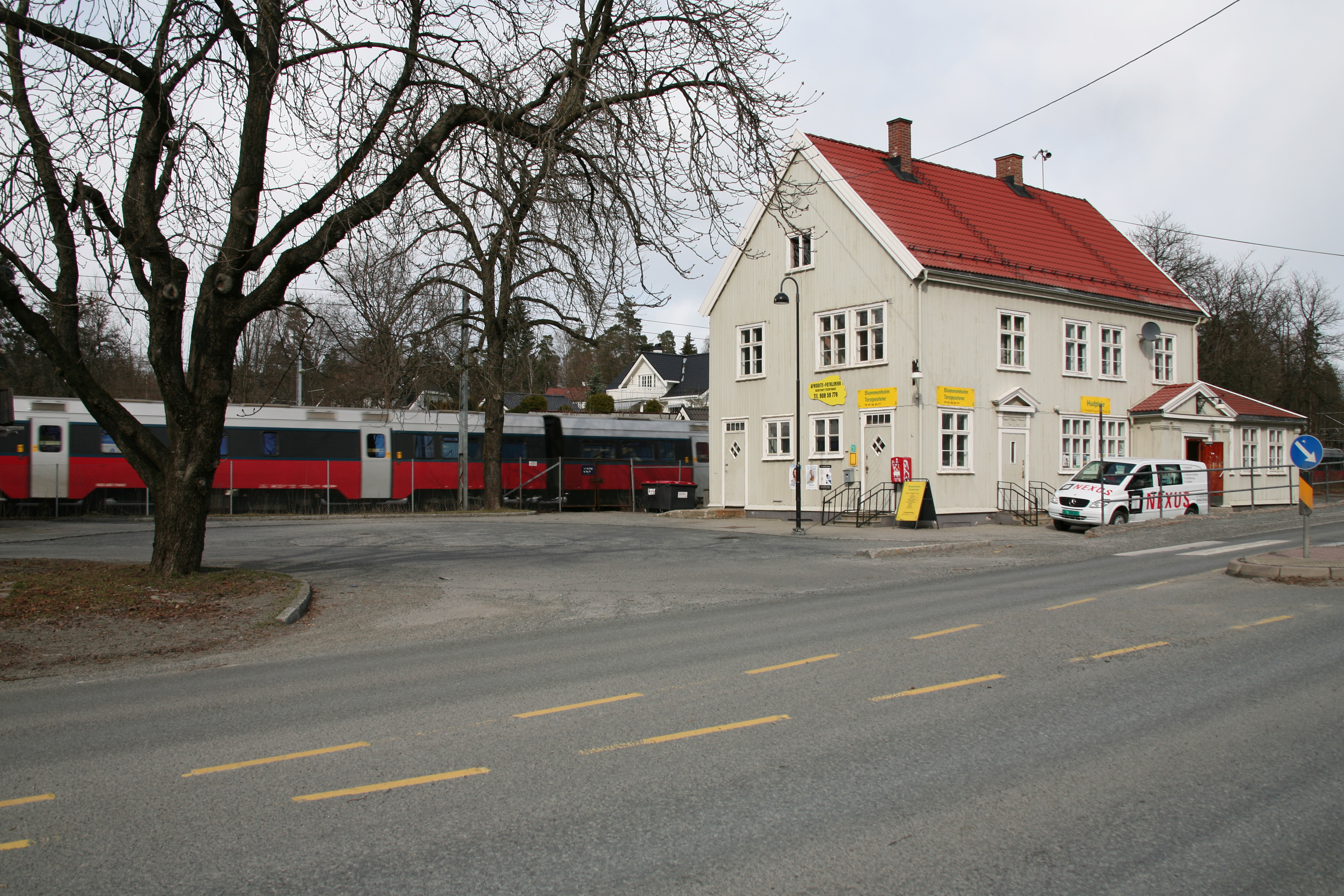
- A Class 70 train passing through Blommenholm Station

General information
- Location: Stasjonsveien 10, Blommenholm, Bærum; Norway
- Coordinates: 59°53′50″N 10°33′18″E
- Elevation: 24.0 m (78.7 ft)
- Owner: Bane NOR
- Operator: Vy
- Line: Drammen Line
- Distance: 12.23 km (7.60 mi)
- Platforms: 1 island platform
- Tracks: 2

Construction
- Parking: 83 places
- Cycle facilities: Yes
- Architect: Eivind Gleditsch

Other information
- Fare zone: 2V

History
- Opened: 10 May 1910
- Rebuilt: 1919
- Electrified: 30 August 1922

Passengers
- 2008: 600 (daily)
Location
- Location within Akershus

Blommenholm Station (Norwegian: Blommenholm stasjon) is a railway station of the Drammen Line situated at Blommenholm in Bærum, Norway. Located 12.23 kilometres (7.60 mi) from Oslo Central Station, it is served by line L1 of the Oslo Commuter Rail. It is located in a primarily residential area and has four regular hourly services operated by Vy. The station features an island platform accessible from the station building on the south side.

The station opened on 10 May 1910, following the construction of housing in the vicinity. It received major upgrade from 1917 to 1922, when an all-new station building was constructed and the railway was doubled, electrified and gauge converted to standard gauge. This gave a thirty-minute headway to Oslo and Sandvika. Blommenholm was staffed until 1969 and previously featured a post office.

== History ==
The Drammen Line past the site of Blommenholm Station opened as a narrow gauge railway on 7 October 1872. During the planning of the Drammen Line there was a disagreement of the route through Blommenholm. The owner of the eponymous farm wanted the tracks to run on the north side of his farm, but this demand was not met.

Demands for a station were put forward by Christian Homan. He had bought the farm of Blommenholm with the intent of selling the land for residential development. The new residents at first used Sandvika Station and Høvik Station. However, the roads were poor and it was not uncommon to ski to the station during the winter. To ensure better means of transport for his new residential area, Homan started working to convince the Norwegian State Railways that they should build a station to serve Blommenholm. Homan offered free land and 25,000 Norwegian krone and the railway company agreed to build the station in what became the first major case for the new residents' association.

The original station building opened on 10 May 1910. The station, situated on the north side, only had a single track and narrow gauge. Originally, there were only three trains per day per direction which stopped at Blommenholm. However, they would only stop intermediately at Høvik before running directly to Oslo West Station.

The line from Sandvika to Oslo was substantially upgraded between 1917 and 1922. From 27 February 1917 standard gauge traffic was carried out on the northern track. A southern track was then built, which was used by narrow gauge trains. However, both were dual gauge. All-standard gauge operations commenced on 9 February 1920, although the dual gauge was not removed until 1922. Electric traction started operation on 30 August 1922. From 1922 a half-hour headway was introduced on the local trains between Sandvika and Oslo West Station. An interlocking system was installed on 18 October 1924.

The upgrades also resulted in new station buildings on the double-tracked sections, which were designed by NSB Arktitektkontor. The architect for the station was Eivind Gleditsch. These were the first stations in Norway designed for double-track operations and were designed in Baroque Revival architecture. As the others it featured an island platform. The old station building was demolished and a new and larger station building was built in 1919. It featured a station master's residence, a kiosk and a post office. During the late 1920s NSB installed advertisement boards at the station. This caused protests from the residents' association and NSB decided to remove them in 1929.

Blommenholm was downgraded to a halt on 1 February 1969 and was subsequently no longer staffed. A major upgrade to the service came in 1973. New Class 69 trains were put into service. Along with the closing of some stations, it allowed travel time to Oslo to drop from 22 to 12 minutes. During this period the station was repeatedly subject to vandalism, especially the breaking of the windows. In 1983 NSB went to the step of rebuilding the platform building so it became a shed without windows. The line past Blommenholm received centralized traffic control and automatic train stop on 3 December 1992.

The opening of the Bærum Tunnel, the second phase of the Asker Line, 26 August 2011, meant that express and regional trains bypassed Høvik Station altogether and run directly from Lysaker to Sandvika. Subsequently, the Drammen Line between Lysaker and Sandvika was upgraded. While this involved a full replacement of the superstructure and renovations of Høvik Station and Stabekk Station, there was not sufficient funding to complete Blommenholm. Therefore, unlike the other two stations, Blommenholm did not receive universally accessible platforms. However, the underpass was modernized. To carry out efficient construction work, the segment of track was closed and all trains diverted via the Bærum Tunnel from 7 April 2013 to 13 December 2014. The upgrades freed up track capacity allowing the number of trains to increase from two to four per direction per hour.

== Facilities ==
Høvik Station is situated on the Drammen Line, 11.27 kilometres (7.00 mi) from Oslo Central Station at an elevation of 24.0 metres (78.7 ft). The station features a station building on the south side of the tracks. Trains are served from an island platform, which is connected so Stasjonsveien via an underpass through the station building. Neither access to the station building nor the platform is in accordance with the principles of universal accessibility. The platform is about 50 centimetres (20 in) tall and slightly curved. There is parking in conjunction with the station building, with capacity for 83 vehicles.

== Service ==
Vy serves Høvik with line L1 of the Oslo Commuter Rail. L1 calls at all stations, running from Spikkestad Station along the Spikkestad Line to Asker Station and past Blommenholm to Oslo Central Station. It then continues along the Trunk Line to Lillestrøm Station. Blommenholm has four trains per direction per hour.

Blommenholm is situated in what is mostly a residential area. However, there is one major working place in the vicinity: Det Norske Veritas. There is provided a shuttle bus service from Blommenholm Station to this facility. The station had about 600 passengers per day in 2008.

== Bibliography ==
- Bjerke, Thor; Holom, Finn (2004). Banedata 2004 (in Norwegian). Hamar / Oslo: Norsk Jernbanemuseum / Norsk Jernbaneklubb. ISBN 82-90286-28-7.
- Hartmann, Eivind; Mangset, Øistein; Reisegg, Øyvind (1997). Neste stasjon (in Norwegian). Gyldendal. ISBN 82-05-25294-7.
- Lindemann, Hans (1986). Blommenhol vel 1911–1986 (in Norwegian). Bærum: Blommenholm Vel.
- Løken, Thorleif (1936). Blommenholm vel gjennem 25 år (in Norwegian). Bærum: Blommenholm Vel.
- Wisting, Tor (2002). Høvik Vel 100 år (in Norwegian). Bærum: Høvik Vel.

Preceding station			Following station
Sandvika	Drammen Line		Høvik; Ramstad
Preceding station	Local trains		Following station
Sandvika	L1	Spikkestad–Oslo S–Lillestrøm	Høvik
