= Hovik Vardoumian =

Armenian writer

Hovik Vardoumian Հովիկ Վարդումյան
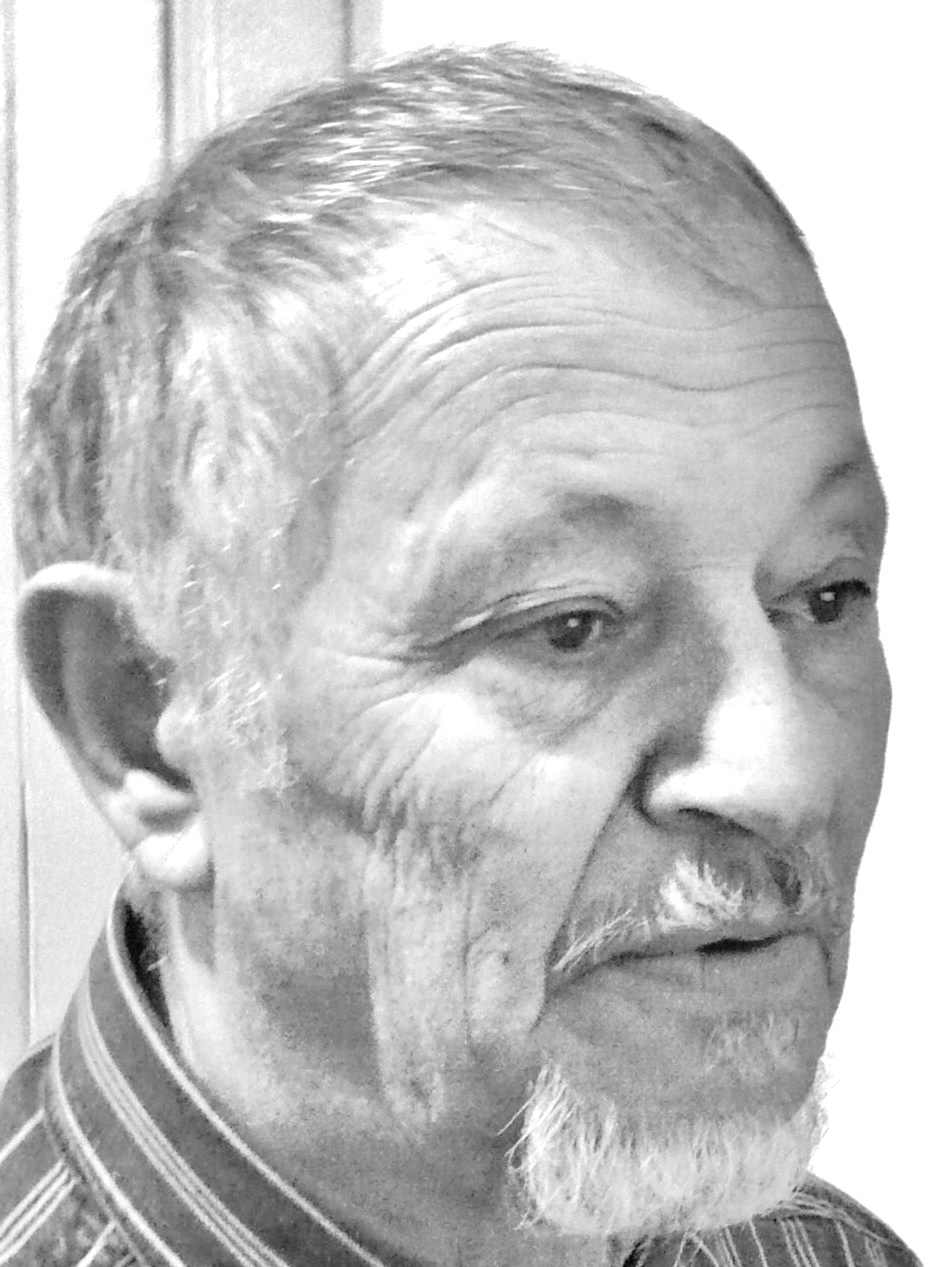
- Born: 26 July 1940 (age 86); Chochkan, Armenia
- Occupations: Novelist and writer

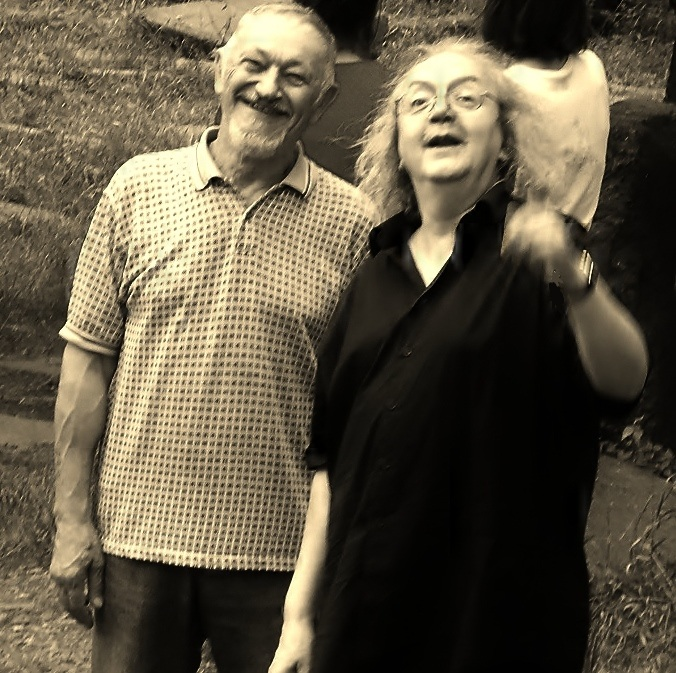
Hovik Vardoumian and Serge Venturini, Summer of 2011.

Hovik Vardoumian (Armenian: Հովիկ Վարդումյան, July 26, 1940 in Born Jojkan, Armenia) is an Armenian short story writer and novelist.

== Biography ==
Hovik Vardoumian born 26 July 1940 in the locality of Chochkan in the current Lori marz to the north of Armenia. Having studied at the Yerevan Polytechnic Institute, he became an engineer constructor at the Institute of Physics Yerevan.

Hovik Vardoumian was interested in poetry throughout his infancy. However, he started writing in prose but little was published in the Soviet era. He served as a volunteer during the war in Nagorno-Karabakh until 1993.

He is a member of the Writers Union of Armenia. His novels and writings have been translated into Russian, Ukrainian, Persian, English and French.

== Literary works ==
- Such a history, 1983;
- Valley of Dreams, 1986;
- Eagles die and 1997;
- The commander of the soldiers attack, 1999;
- The return of the goddess Anahite, 2002;
- A short novel for men, 2003;
- Maze, short stories, 2003;
- Conversation with Hrant Matévossian, 2003;
- Kanter, 2011.
