= Rudskogen Motorsenter Station =

Railway station in Rakkestad, Norway

Rudskogen Motorsenter

General information
- Location: Rudskogen, Rakkestad, Østfold; Norway
- Coordinates: 59.358°N 11.280°E
- Owner: Norwegian State Railways
- Line: Eastern Østfold Line
- Distance: 62.90 km (39.08 mi) from Oslo S
- Platforms: 1 side platform

History
- Opened: 19 May 1990
- Closed: 1990
Location
- Location within Østfold Location within Norway

Rudskogen Motorsenter Station (Norwegian: Rudskogen motorsenter holdeplass) was a railway station on the Eastern Østfold Line located at Rudskogen in Rakkestad, Norway. Situated 62.90 kilometers (39.08 mi) from Oslo Central Station (Oslo S), it featured a simple platform. The station was located next to the motorsport venue Rudskogen Motorsenter. The station was opened on 19 May 1990 and was only used that year. It was only served during sporting events with shuttle trains operating to a parking lot located next to Kampenes Station.

== History ==
Rudskogen Motorsenter was the first asphalt circuit built in Eastern Norway and was officially opened in May 1990. The logistics were organized in such a way that a parking lot was built at Kampenes, 12 kilometers (7.5 mi) south of the venue, in Sarpsborg. The stations were first used on the 19 and 20 May, with the Norwegian State Railways operating a shuttle service between Kampenes and Rudskogen. This was not a success and both stations were abandoned after the 1990 season. The station was never used by scheduled trains. The same season NSB also opened Hauge Station between Fredrikstad and Sarpsborg in order to serve the sports venue Østfoldhallen.

== Facilities ==
The station was situated on the Eastern Østfold Line, 62.90 kilometers (39.08 mi) from Oslo S. This was just 230 meters (750 ft) south of Rudskau Station. The station was situated along a section of single track and only featured a simple platform.

Preceding station		Following station
Rudskau	Eastern Østfold Line	Mikkelshytta
