= Miland Station =

Abandoned railway station in Norway

Miland

General information
- Location: Miland, Tinn Municipality; Norway
- Coordinates: 59°55′21″N 8°44′44″E
- Elevation: 207.7 m (681 ft)
- Owner: Norsk Transport
- Operator: Norsk Transport
- Line: Rjukan Line
- Distance: 4.44 km (2.76 mi)
- Platforms: 1

History
- Opened: August 9, 1909
Location

Miland Station (Norwegian: Miland stasjon) is an abandoned railway station on the Rjukan Line at Miland in Tinn Municipality, Norway. It was in use from 1909 to 1970 by Norsk Transport.

== History ==
The station opened as a stop on August 9, 1909, received cargo expedition on May 1, 1917, while the station building opened in January 1919, after World War I had delayed the building. After the steamship operations on Lake Tinn terminated in the 1930s the traffic to the station increased, since all cargo and passengers had to use the railway. The station served a rural area with up to eleven general stores, hotels and a tourist industry.

The station became unstaffed in 1969 and was closed on May 31, 1970, when passenger transport on the Rjukan Line terminated. It was sold as a residence in 1985, but torn down in 1989 as part of the new Route 37 highway.
