= Blommenholm =

Coordinates: 59°54′N 010°33′E

- Village
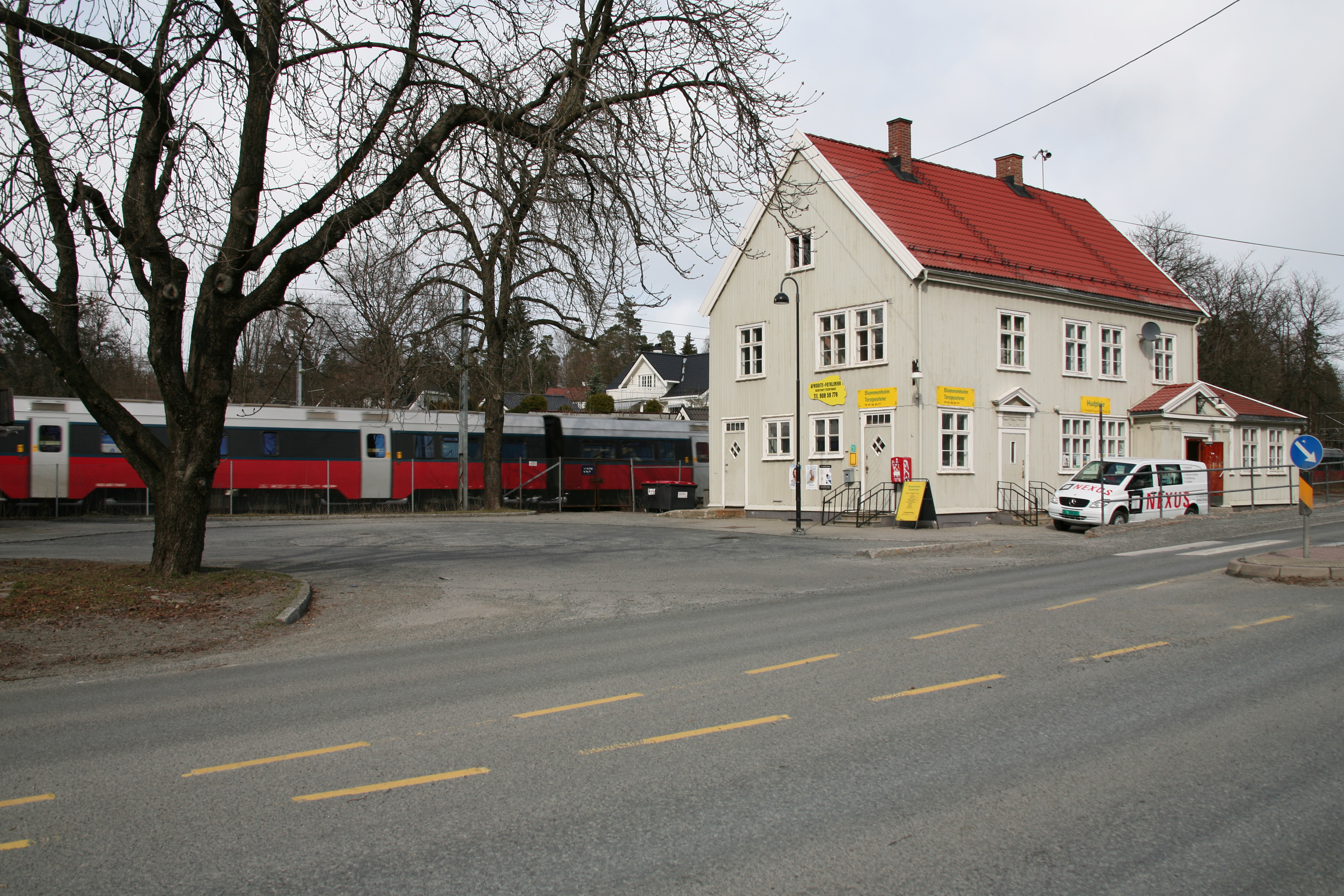
- Blommenholm Railway Station, Norway

- Location in Akershus
- Country: Norway
- Region: Østlandet
- County: Akershus
- Municipality: Bærum
- Time zone: UTC+01:00 (CET)
  - Summer (DST): UTC+02:00 (CEST)

Blommenholm is a district in the municipality of Bærum, Norway. Its population (2007) is 2,936.

It is served by the train station Blommenholm on the Drammen Line. The station is located 12.23 kilometres (7.60 mi) from Oslo Central Station.
