= Årlifoss Station =

Railway station in Notodden, Norway

Årlifoss
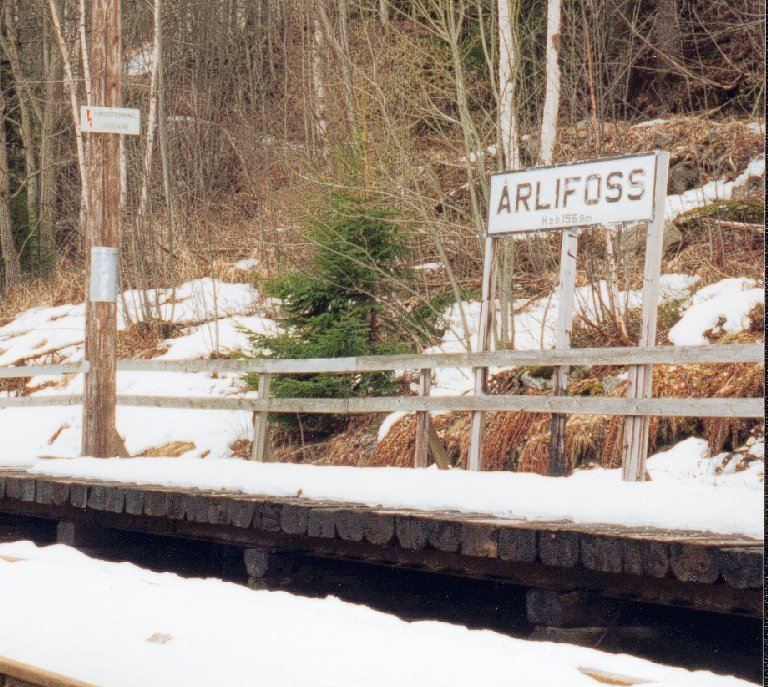
- c.1997

General information
- Location: Årlifoss, Notodden Municipality; Norway
- Coordinates: 59°40′56″N 9°09′08″E
- Elevation: 157.3 m (516 ft)
- Owner: Norwegian State Railways
- Operator: Norwegian State Railways
- Line: Tinnoset Line
- Distance: 164.09 km
- Platforms: 1

Construction
- Architect: Thorvald Astrup

History
- Opened: 1914
Location

Årlifoss Station (Norwegian: Årlifoss stasjon) was a railway station serving Årlifoss in Notodden Municipality, Norway on the Tinnoset Line from 1914 to the line closed in 1991.

Designed by Thorvald Astrup it opened in 1914 as Aarlifoss. It got the current name in April 1924, but downgraded to a stop on 1 March 1924. On 12 July 1982 it was moved 34 meters and the station building razed. It was closed along with the railway on 1 January 1991.

Preceding station		Following station
Grønvollfoss	Tinnoset Line	Gransherad
