= Grønvollfoss Station =

Railway station in Notodden, Norway

Grønvollfoss
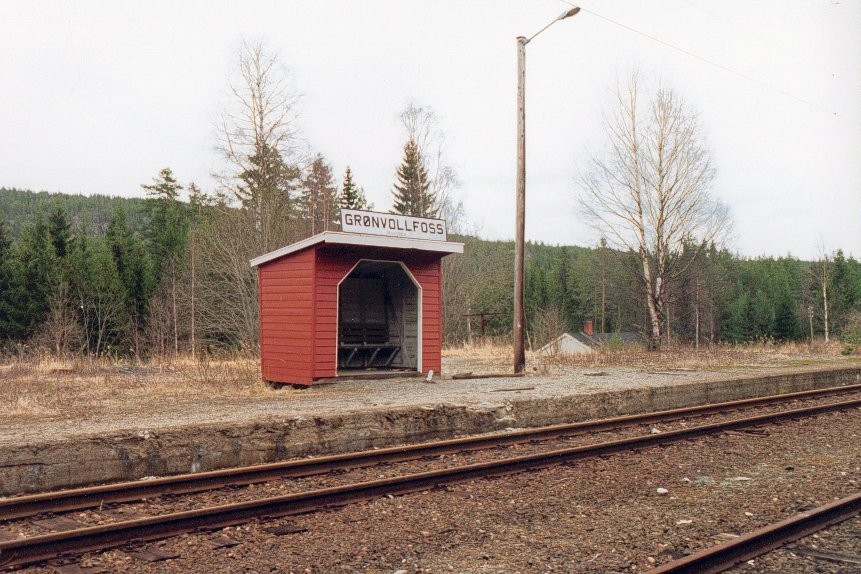
- c.1997

General information
- Location: Grønvollfoss, Notodden Municipality; Norway
- Coordinates: 59°39′05″N 9°12′50″E
- Elevation: 136.3 m (447 ft)
- Owner: Norwegian State Railways
- Operator: Norwegian State Railways
- Line: Tinnoset Line
- Distance: 158.70 km (98.61 mi)
- Platforms: 1

Construction
- Architect: Thorvald Astrup

History
- Opened: 9 August 1909
Location

Grønvollfoss Station (Norwegian: Grønvollfoss stasjon) was a railway station serving Grønvollfoss in Notodden Municipality, Norway on the Tinnoset Line from 1909 to the line closed in 1991.

Designed by Thorvald Astrup it opened on 9 August 1909 as a stop called Grøndvoldsfoss. It got the current name on 1 January 1922. It became a station in 1965, but a stop again in 1976 after the station was razed. It was staffed until 1960. It was closed along with the railway on 1 January 1991.

Preceding station		Following station
Lisleherad	Tinnos Line	Årlifoss
