= Høvik Station =

Railway station in Bærum, Norway

Høvik
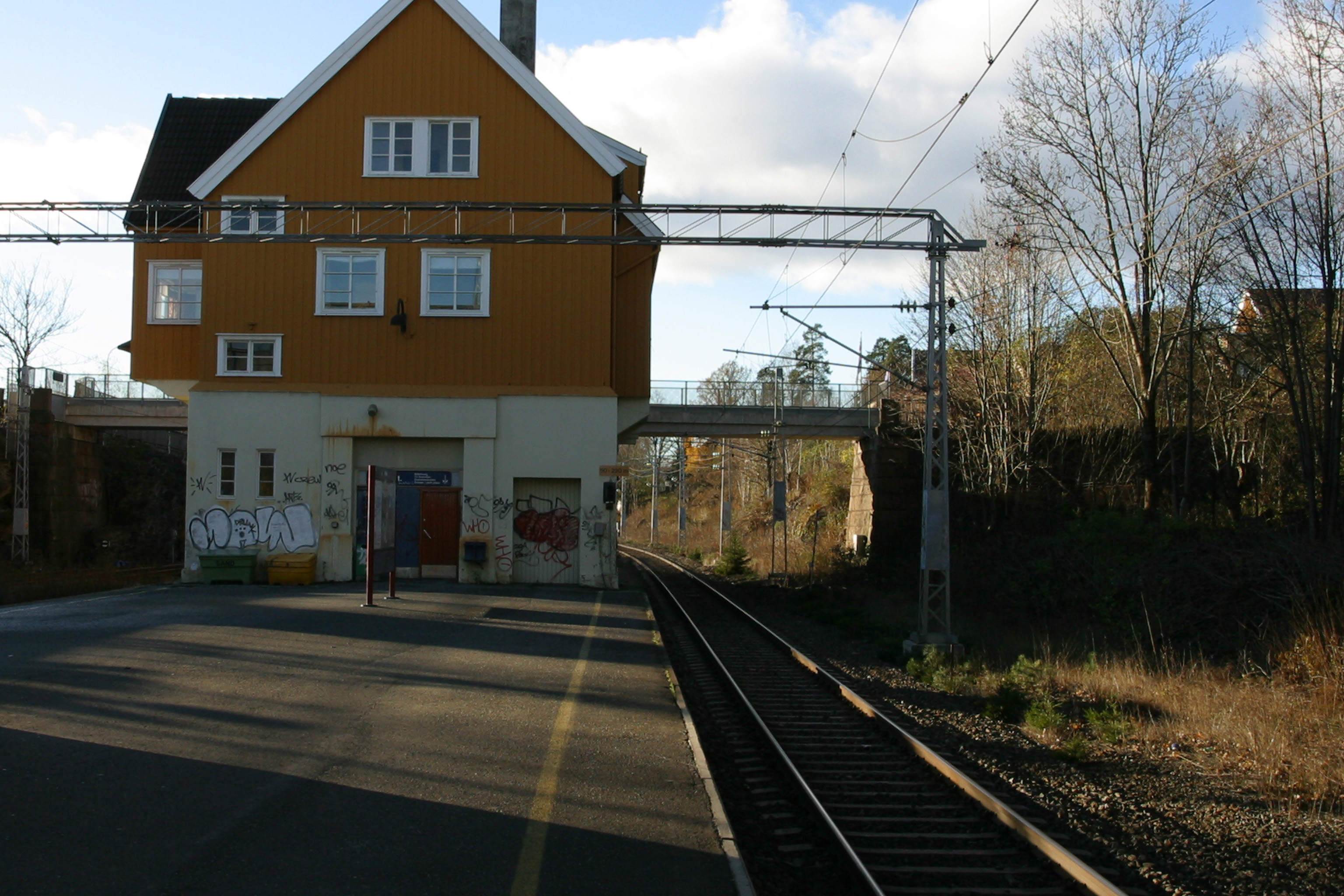
- The now demolished station building from 1922

General information
- Location: Høvikssvingen, Høvik, Bærum; Norway
- Coordinates: 59°54′2″N 10°34′50″E
- Elevation: 23.8 m (78 ft)
- Owner: Bane NOR
- Operator: Vy
- Line: Drammen Line
- Distance: 10.72 km (6.66 mi)
- Platforms: 2 side platforms
- Tracks: 5

Construction
- Accessible: Yes
- Architect: Georg Andreas Bull (1874); Ragnvald Utne (1922)

Other information
- Fare zone: 2V

History
- Opened: 1 May 1874
- Rebuilt: 22 February 1922; 14 December 2014
- Electrified: 30 August 1922

Passengers
- 2008: 400 (daily)
Location
- Location within Akershus

Høvik Station (Norwegian: Høvik stasjon) is a railway station of the Drammen Line situated at Høvik in Bærum, Norway. Located 10.72 kilometers (6.66 mi) from Oslo Central Station, it is served by line L1 of the Oslo Commuter Rail. It is located in a residential area and has four regular hourly services operated by Vy. The station features two accessible side platforms and an underpass. There are five tracks, three of which are used for turnaround, parking and splitting of trains.

The station, designed by Georg Andreas Bull, opened on 1 May 1874, two years after the line. It received major upgrade from 1917 to 1922, when an all-new station building and island platform were built, while the railway was doubled, electrified and gauge converted to standard gauge. This gave a thirty-minuted headway to Oslo and Sandvika. Høvik was staffed until 1995. It received a new upgrade in 2013 and 2014, when the buildings were demolished and new tracks installed.

== History ==
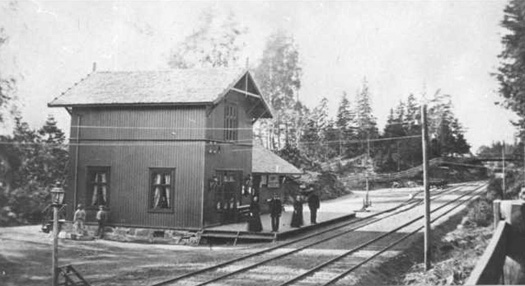
The original station during the 1870s

The Drammen Line past the site of Høvik Station opened as a narrow gauge railway on 7 October 1872. The railway station serving Høvik opened on 1 May 1874. It was the first railway station between Sandvika Station and Lysaker Station. The new means of transport allowed the Høvik area to develop as a suburban residential area allowing commuters to travel to the capital. The original station building was a standard design by Georg Andreas Bull used for most stations along the Drammen Line. In addition to a station building it featured a Narvesen kiosk. A spur to load cars with compost and garbage was installed in 1908. Bærum Municipality established a public library for Høvik in 1911. From their establishment to 1924 they were located next to the station building.

The line from Sandvika to Oslo was substantially upgraded between 1917 and 1922. From 27 February 1917 a passing loop was built at Høvik and standard gauge traffic was carried out on the northern track. A southern track was then built, which was used by narrow gauge trains. However, both were dual gauge. All–standard gauge operations commenced on 9 February 1920, although the dual gauge was not removed until 1922. Electric traction started operation on 30 August 1922. An interlocking system was installed on 6 October 1924.

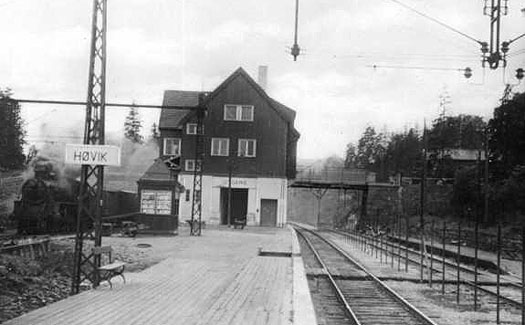
The second station during the 1920s

The upgrades also resulted in new station buildings on the double tracked sections, which were designed by NSB Arktitektkontor. Architect for the station was Ragnvald Utne. These were the first stations in Norway designed for double-track operations and were designed in Baroque Revival architecture. As the others it featured an island platform. Høvik was in this series unusual in that it was not built as an elevation station and instead had the station located on the platform. The old station building was moved to Spikkestad Station.

The new station building opened on 22 February 1922. The main floor featured a common office for the station master, signaling control, telegraphy and ticket sales, a room for cargo handling and a waiting room for passengers. The station master's apartment in the upper story consisted of four rooms and a kitchen. However, it had limited space due to roof angles and steep stairs. There was also a cargo building on the platform and the station featured six tracks at the time. In 1926 the station was staffed by a station master, a clerk, a switcher, five telegraphists, six station workers and a journeyman.

From 1922 a half-hour headway was introduced on the local trains between Sandvika and Oslo West Station. Two more stations in the Høvik area opened on 1 November 1931. By building Strand Station and Ramstad Station, the number of local bus routes could be reduced. They would remain in service until August 1978. Høvik Station received centralized traffic control on 3 December 1992 and became unstaffed as of 15 January 1995.

The opening of the Bærum Tunnel, the second phase of the Asker Line, 26 August 2011, meant that express and regional trains bypassed Høvik Station all together and run directly from Lysaker to Sandvika. As part of the Asker Line project, Lysaker Station was upgraded, allowing the Norwegian State Railways to terminate more of their trains there instead of at Skøyen Station. The work on Lysaker Station was completed in August 2011, but because of there was no capacity to turn around trains at Lysaker, the increased capacity was placed on hold until December 2014. This required that a new site to turn around trains was found.

Høvik was one of several locations proposed and was preferred due to the availability of space combined to the vicinity to Lysaker. While the new turnaround tracks are being built, the project allows for the full upgrade of the station area to modern standards. The Norwegian Public Roads Administration also carried out some construction work regarding the road network in the area. The project, estimated to cost 652 million, includes a full upgrade to all infrastructure on the Drammen Line between Lysaker and Sandvika. In addition to Høvik, Stabekk Station and Blommenholm Station were modernized.

Skanska won the contract to build the new Høvik Station. To carry out efficient construction work, the segment of track was closed and all trains diverted via the Bærum Tunnel from 7 April 2013 to 13 December 2014. The upgrades saw the demolition of the station building. In addition 670 metres (2,200 ft) of sound shields were built along the sides of the tracks. However, the signaling system, built by Thales Rail Signalling Solutions, was delayed. The upgrades freed up track capacity allowing the number of trains to increase from two to four per direction per hour.

== Facilities ==
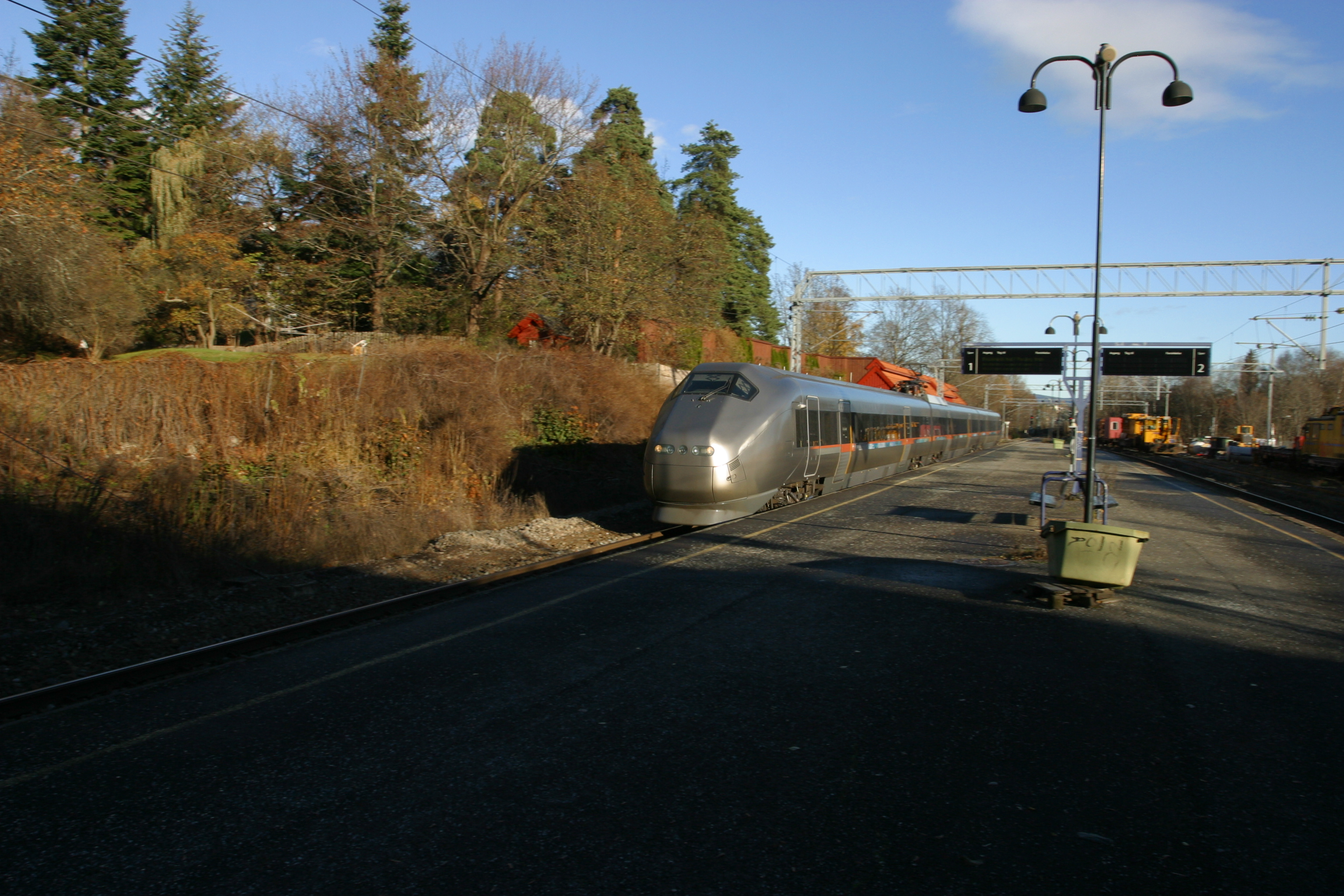
A Class 71 train of the Airport Express Train passing through Høvik Station. These trains do not serve the station, but prior to 2011 operated as a passing train on the section of the Drammen Line.

Høvik Station is situated on the Drammen Line, 10.72 kilometers (6.66 mi) from Oslo Central Station at an elevation of 23.8 meters (78 ft). The station features five tracks. Two of these are located on each their side platform, serving trains in each direction. The platforms are 220 meters (720 ft) long and 76 centimeters (30 in) tall, providing universally accessibility. The center three tracks are used for parking, turning and splitting of trains.

There is an underpass on the eastern end of the station, which provides access between the platforms and to the streets on each side. Both platforms are available by elevator. On the south side of the station there are bicycle parking, park and ride and kiss and ride facilities with immediate access to European Road E18. There is capacity for 95 bicycles and 77 cars, including 3 disabled parking spaces, 5 charging stations for electric cars and a taxi stand.

== Service ==
Vy serves Høvik with line L1 of the Oslo Commuter Rail. L1 calls at all stations, running from Spikkestad Station along the Spikkestad Line to Asker Station and past Høvik to Oslo Central Station. It then continues along the Trunk Line to Lillestrøm Station. Høvik has four trains per direction per hour. The station had about 400 daily passengers in 2008.

== Bibliography ==
- Bjerke, Thor; Holom, Finn (2004). Banedata 2004 (in Norwegian). Hamar / Oslo: Norsk Jernbanemuseum / Norsk Jernbaneklubb. ISBN 82-90286-28-7.
- Hartmann, Eivind; Mangset, Øistein; Reisegg, Øyvind (1997). Neste stasjon (in Norwegian). Gyldendal. ISBN 82-05-25294-7.
- Wisting, Tor (2002). Høvik Vel 100 år (in Norwegian). Bærum: Høvik Vel.

| Preceding station | | | Following station |
|---|---|---|---|
| Blommenholm; Ramstad | Drammen Line | | Stabekk; Strand |
| Preceding station | Local trains | | Following station |
| Blommenholm | L1 | Spikkestad–Oslo S–Lillestrøm | Stabekk |
