= Lisleherad Station =

Historic railway station in Norway

Lisleherad
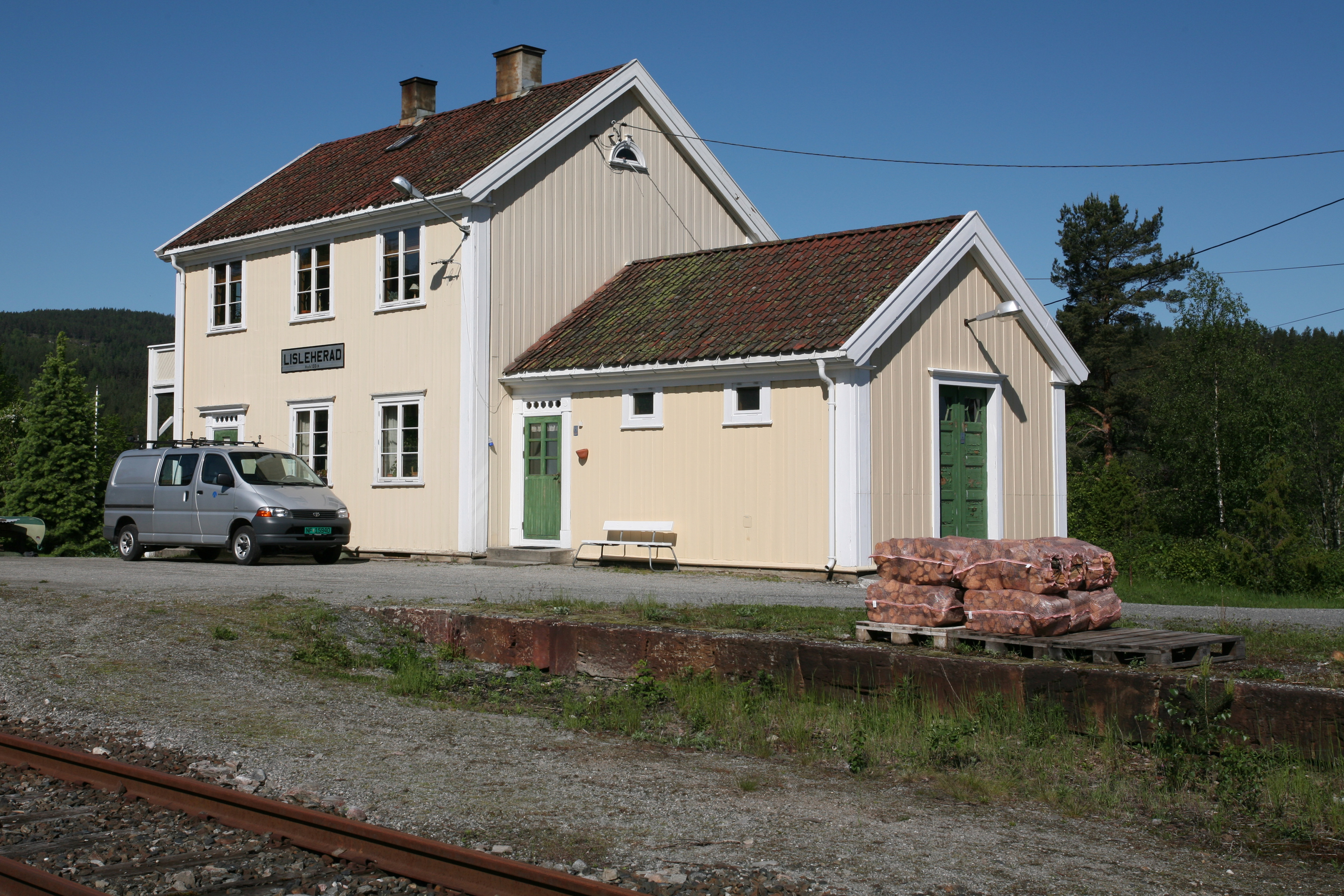

General information
- Location: Lisleherad, Notodden Municipality; Norway
- Coordinates: 59°36′16″N 9°16′40″E
- Elevation: 134.0 m (439.6 ft)
- Owner: Norwegian State Railways
- Operator: Norwegian State Railways
- Line: Tinnoset Line
- Distance: 151.02 km
- Platforms: 1

Construction
- Architect: Thorvald Astrup

History
- Opened: 9 August 1909
Location

Lisleherad Station (Norwegian: Lisleherad stasjon) was a railway station serving Lisleherad in Notodden Municipality, Norway on Tinnoset Line from 1909 to the line closed in 1991.

Designed by Thorvald Astrup it opened on 9 August 1909 as Lilleherred, changing to Litleherad on 1 January 1922 and to Lisleherad on 15 October 1922. It was staffed until 1960. After the railway closed it was sold as a residence.

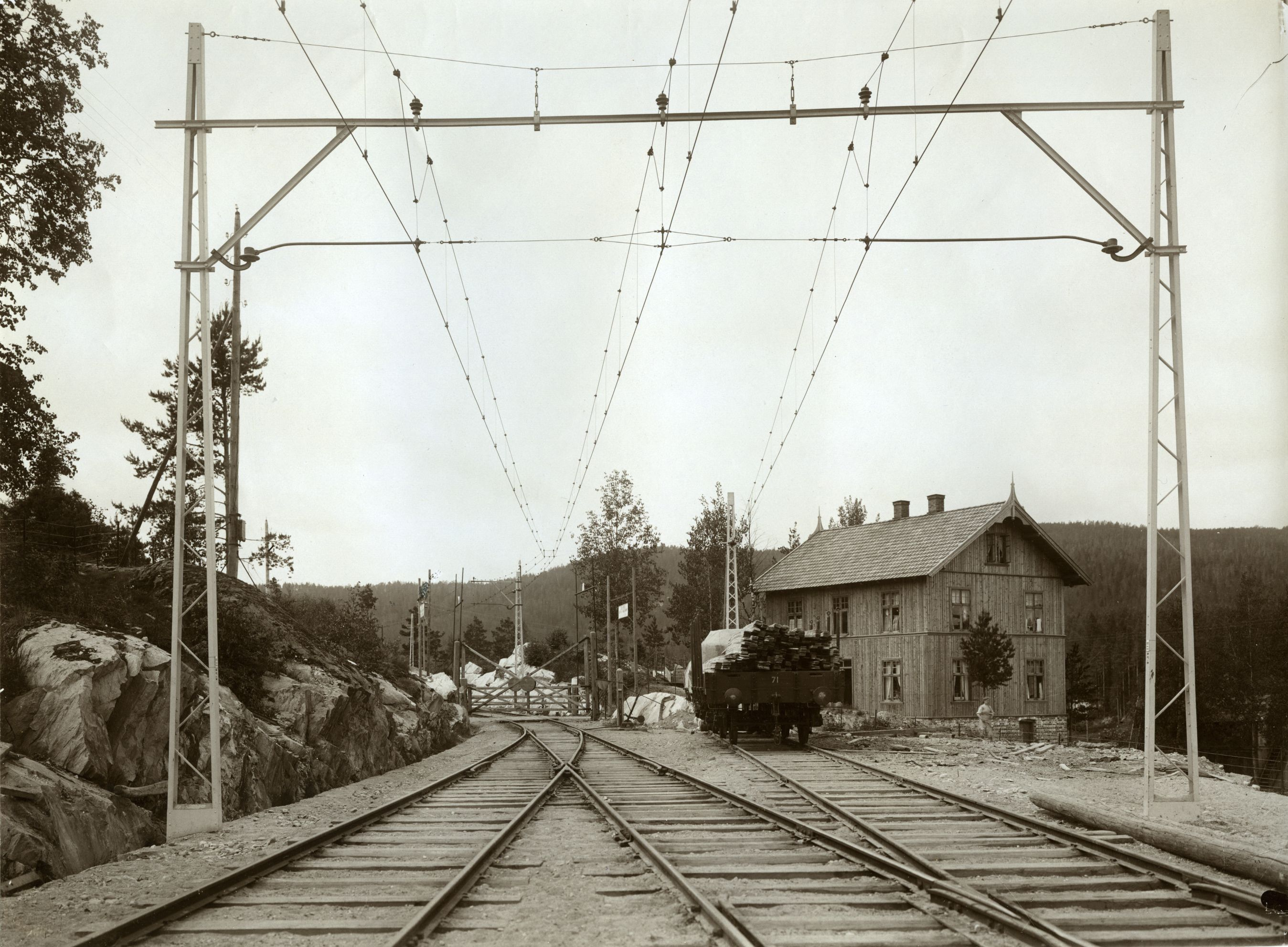
The station in 1911

Preceding station		Following station
Notodden	Tinnoset Line	Grønvollfoss
