= Kampenes Station =

Former railway station in Sarpsborg, Norway

Kampenes

General information
- Location: Kampenes, Sarpsborg, Østfold; Norway
- Coordinates: 59.285°N 11.185°E
- Owner: Norwegian State Railways
- Line: Eastern Østfold Line
- Distance: 75.20 km (46.73 mi) from Oslo S
- Platforms: 1 side platform

History
- Opened: 19 May 1990
- Closed: 1990
Location
- Location within Østfold Location within Norway

Kampenes Station (Norwegian: Kampenes holdeplass) was a railway station on the Eastern Østfold Line located at Kampenes in Sarpsborg, Norway. Situated 75.20 kilometers (46.73 mi) from Oslo Central Station (Oslo S), it featured a simple platform. The station was located next to a large park and ride facility. The station was opened on 19 May 1990 and was only used that year. It was only served during sporting events with shuttle trains operating to Rudskogen Motorsenter Station which served the motorsport venue Rudskogen.

== History ==
Rudskogen Motorsenter was the first asphalt circuit built in Eastern Norway and was officially opened in May 1990. The logistics were organized in such a way that a parking lot was built at Kampenes, 12 kilometers (7.5 mi) south of the venue. The stations were first used on the 19 and 20 May, with the Norwegian State Railways operating a shuttle service between Kampenes and Rudskogen. This was not a success and both stations were abandoned after the 1990 season. The stations was never used by scheduled trains. The same season NSB also opened Hauge Station between Fredrikstad and Sarpsborg in order to serve the sports venue Østfoldhallen.

== Facilities ==
The station was situated on the Eastern Østfold Line, 75.20 kilometers (46.73 mi) from Oslo S. The station was situated along a section of single track and only featured a simple platform.

Preceding station		Following station
Holtenga	Eastern Østfold Line	Kroken
