= Høvik Verk =

- Village
- Interactive map of Høvik Verk
- Coordinates: 59°53′36″N 10°34′00″E
- Time zone: UTC+01:00 (CET)

Høvik Verk is a district in the municipality of Bærum, Norway. Its population as of 2007 is 3,940.
