= Ramstad Station =

Railway station in Bærum, Norway

Ramstad
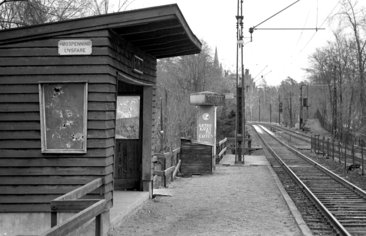
- The station in 1967

General information
- Location: Ramstad, Bærum; Norway
- Coordinates: 59.89917°N 10.56871°E
- Elevation: 24 m (79 ft)
- Owner: Norwegian State Railways
- Line: Drammen Line
- Distance: 10.40 km (6.46 mi) from Oslo V
- Platforms: 2 side platforms
- Tracks: 2

History
- Opened: 1 November 1931
- Closed: 3 July 1973
Location
- Location within Akershus

Ramstad Station (Norwegian: Ramstad holdeplass) was a railway station situated at Ramstad in Bærum, Norway, on the Drammen Line. The station, located 10.40 kilometers (6.46 mi) from Oslo West Station, was served by Oslo Commuter Rail trains of the Norwegian State Railways. Ramstad opened on 1 November 1931 with two simple side platforms. Ticket sales remained until 1964. The station was one of several closed on 3 July 1973 as part of a service upgrade to speed up local trains on the Drammen Line.

== History ==
The neighborhood of Ramstad did not receive a station on the Drammen Line when it opened on 7 October 1872. However, from 1874 it was served by Høvik Station and from 1910 Blommenholm Station. From the 1930s a series of bus routes were established from the area and to attract people to take the train, NSB introduced three new stations on the Drammen Line between Sandvika and Lysaker, all which opened on 1 November 1931. In addition to Ramstad, this consisted of Strand Station and Myra Station. From 1932 to 26 January 1964 the station had a private ticket sales office.

With the opening of the Lieråsen Tunnel, a new route scheme was introduced on the Drammen Line. New and faster Class 69 trains were put into service. To take advantage of this NSB also chose to close three of the stations on the line between Sandvika and Lysaker: Ramstad, Strand and Myra. This allowed the local train from Sandvika to Oslo to reduce travel time by ten minutes. The station was only located 640 meters (2,100 ft) from Høvik and 870 meters (2,850 ft) from Blommenholm. Trains no longer stopped at Ramstad from 3 July 1973, although the station was not officially closed until August 1978.

== Facilities ==
Ramstad Station was situated 10.40 kilometers (6.46 mi) from Oslo West Station, equivalent to 11.38 kilometers (7.07 mi) from Oslo Central Station. It was located at an elevation of 24 meters (79 ft) above mean sea level in the residential neighborhood of Ramstad. The station featured two side platforms along a section of double track and electrified line. The station was served every thirty minutes by the Oslo Commuter Rail service between Sandvika and Oslo West Station.

Preceding station		Following station
Blommenholm	Drammen Line	Høvik
