= Myra Station =

Railway station in Bærum, Norway

Myra
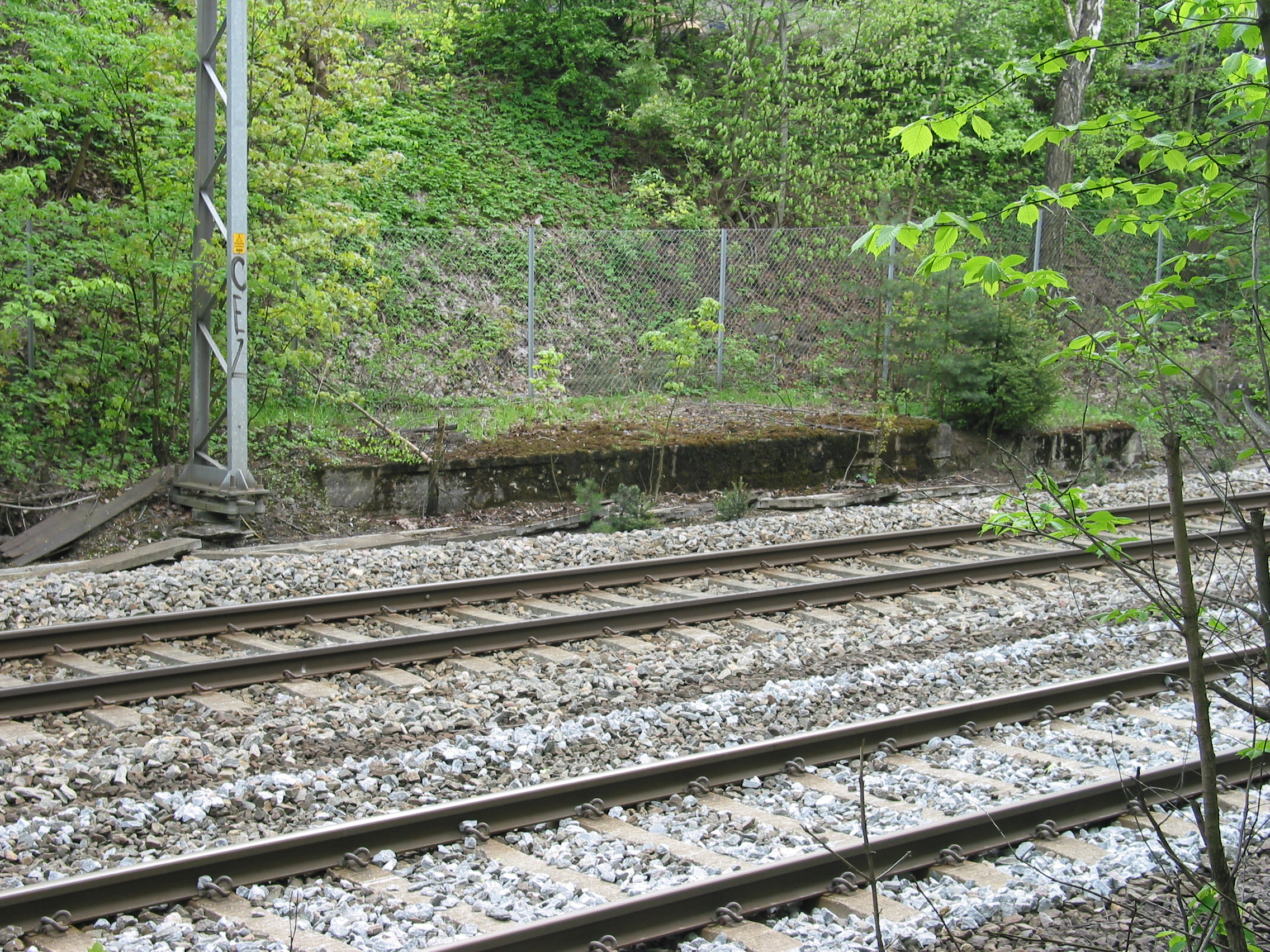

General information
- Location: Myra, Stabekk, Bærum; Norway
- Coordinates: 59.9123°N 10.6192°E
- Elevation: 22 m (72 ft)
- Owner: Norwegian State Railways
- Line: Drammen Line
- Distance: 7.30 km (4.54 mi) from Oslo V
- Platforms: 2 side platforms
- Tracks: 2

History
- Opened: 1 November 1931
- Closed: 3 July 1973
Location
- Location within Akershus

Myra Station (Norwegian: Myra holdeplass) was a railway station situated at Myra in the neighborhood of Stabekk in Bærum, Norway, on the Drammen Line. The station, located 7.30 kilometers (4.54 mi) from Oslo West Station, was served by Oslo Commuter Rail trains of the Norwegian State Railways. Ramstad opened on 1 November 1931 with two simple side platforms. It was opened as Marstrander bro, but took the name Myra eighteen days later. Ticket sales remained until 1964. The station was one of several closed on 3 July 1973 as part of a service upgrade to speed up local trains on the Drammen Line.

== History ==
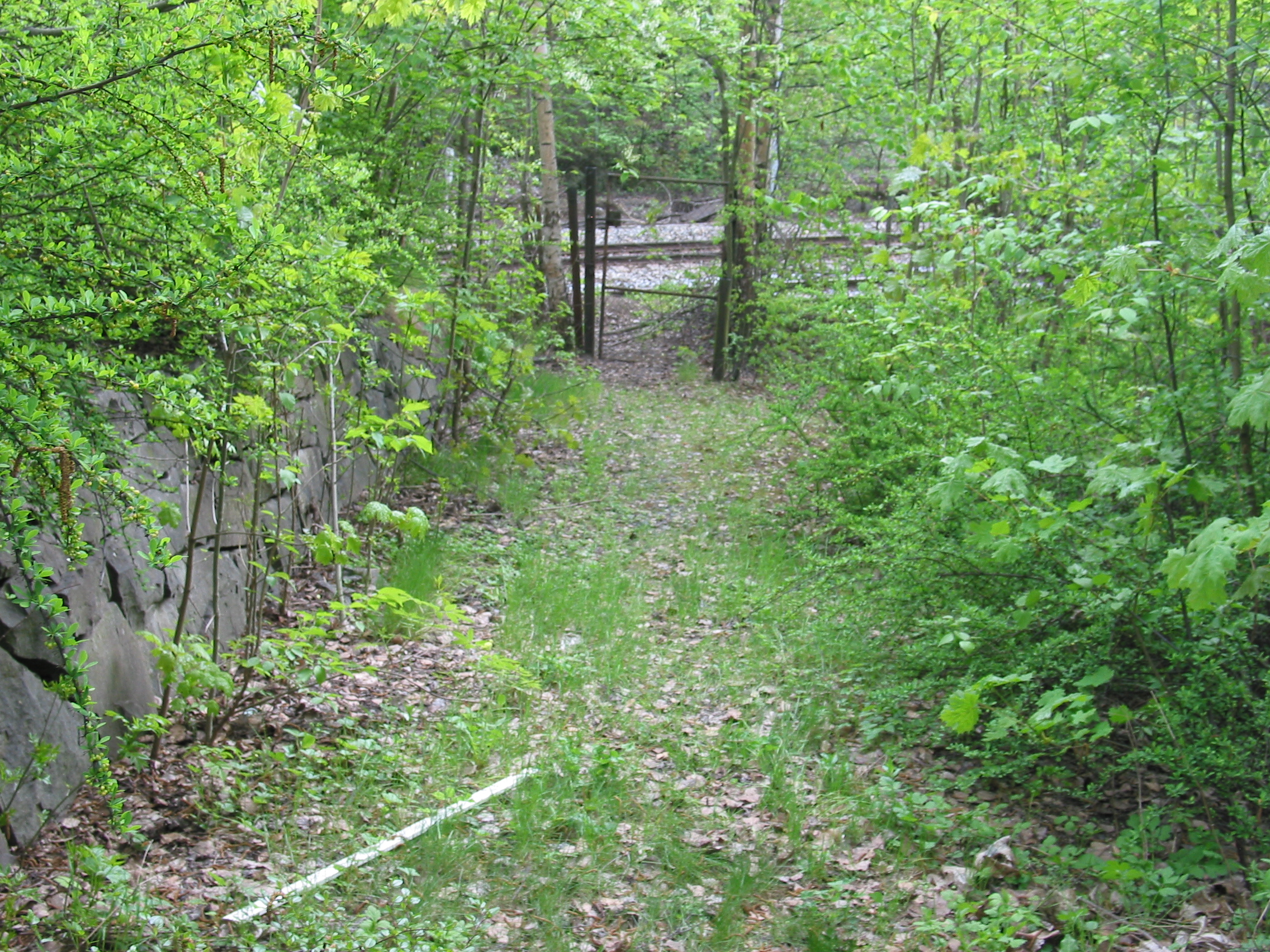
The pathway down to the former station, not entirely overgrown.

The neighborhood of Stabekk did not receive a station on the Drammen Line when it opened on 7 October 1872, originally being designated to use Lysaker Station. Private dwellings grew up in the Stabekk area starting in the 1860s and by the 1880s it had grown sufficiently substantial that it could support a train station, resulting in Stabekk Station opening on 29 May 1884. From the 1930s a series of bus routes were established from the area and to attract people to take the train, NSB introduced three new stations on the Drammen Line between Sandvika and Lysaker, all which opened on 1 November 1931. In addition to Ramstad, this consisted of Ramstad Station and Strand Station.

The station was originally opened as Marstrander bro, named for the bridge over the railways. From 1932 to 26 January 1964 the station had a private ticket sales office.

With the opening of the Lieråsen Tunnel, a new route scheme was introduced on the Drammen Line. New and faster Class 69 trains were put into service. To take advantage of this NSB also chose to close three of the stations on the line between Sandvika and Lysaker: Ramstad, Strand and Myra. This allowed the local train from Sandvika to Oslo to reduce travel time by ten minutes. The station was only located 660 meters (2,170 ft) from Stabekk and 1,280 meters (4,200 ft) from Lysaker. Trains no longer stopped at Myra from 3 July 1973, although the station was not officially closed until August 1978.

== Facilities ==
Ramstad Station was situated 7.30 kilometers (4.54 mi) from Oslo West Station, equivalent to 8.28 kilometers (5.14 mi) from Oslo Central Station. It was located at an elevation of 24 meters (79 ft) above mean sea level in the residential neighborhood of Stabekk. The station featured two side platforms along a section of double track and electrified line. The station was served every thirty minutes by the Oslo Commuter Rail service between Sandvika and Oslo West Station. Located nearby are also a tennis court and a bandy field, as well as the schools Lysaker Primary and Stabekk Upper Secondary.

Preceding station		Following station
Stabekk	Drammen Line	Lysaker
