= Gransherad Station =

Railway station in Notodden, Norway

Gransherad
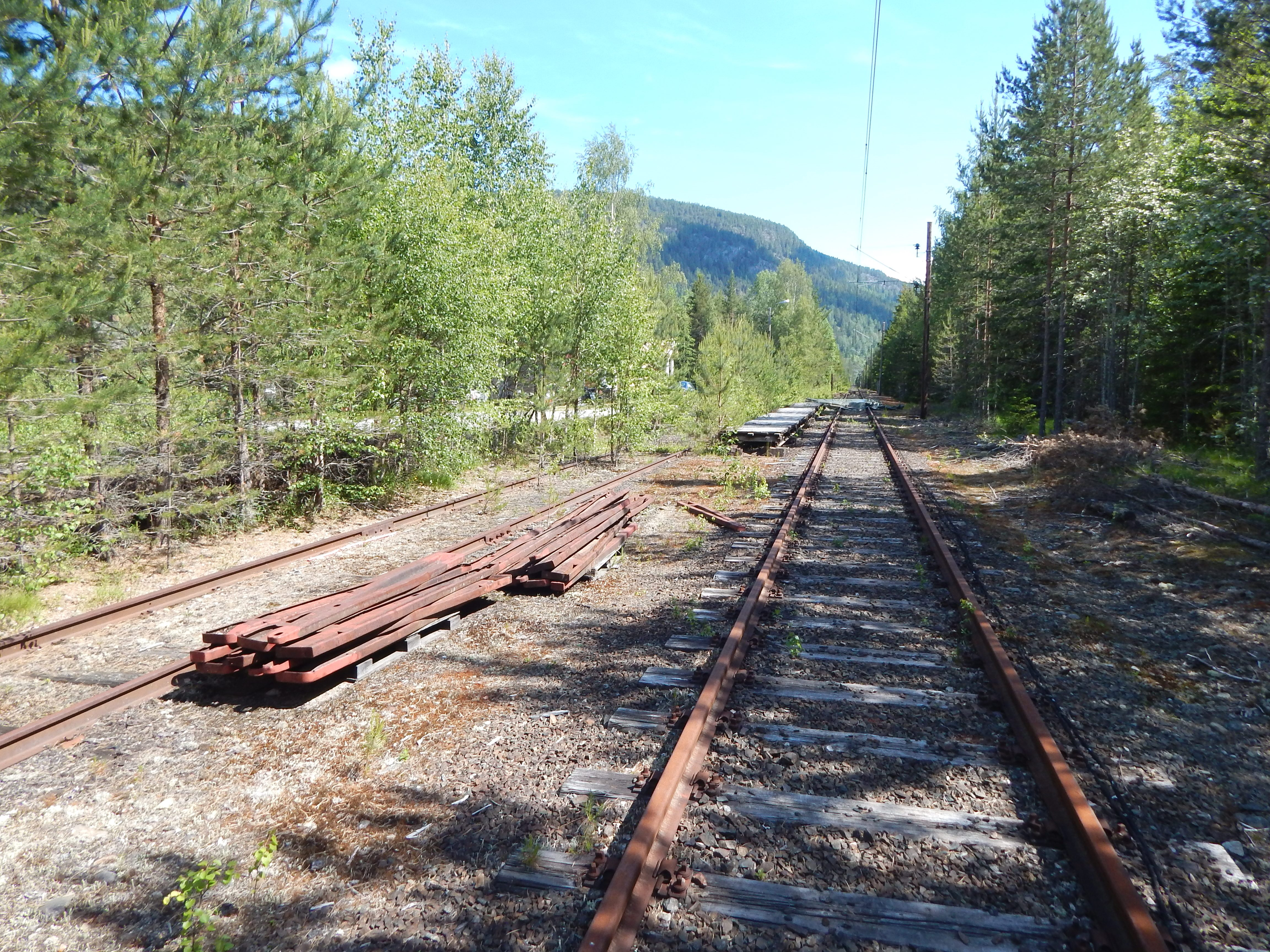
- The station area in 2015

General information
- Location: Gransherad, Notodden Municipality; Norway
- Coordinates: 59°41′31″N 9°02′39″E
- Elevation: 187 m (614 ft)
- Owner: Norwegian State Railways
- Operator: Norwegian State Railways
- Line: Tinnoset Line
- Distance: 170.45 km
- Platforms: 1

Construction
- Architect: Thorvald Astrup

History
- Opened: 9 August 1909
- Closed: 1 January 1991
Location

Gransherad Station (Norwegian: Gransherad stasjon) was a railway station serving Gransherad in Notodden Municipality, Norway. It was located on the Tinnoset Line from 1909 until the line closed in 1991.

Designed by Thorvald Astrup it opened on 9 August 1909 as Gransherred. It got the current name on 1 January 1922, but downgraded to a stop on 10 June 1968. NSB contracted the razing of the building, but the entrepreneur liked the building so much he instead moved it to his home village of Hørte in 1986. The station was closed along with the railway on 1 January 1991.

Preceding station		Following station
Årlifoss	Tinnoset Line	Tinnoset
