= Notodden Old Station =

Railway Station

Notodden Old
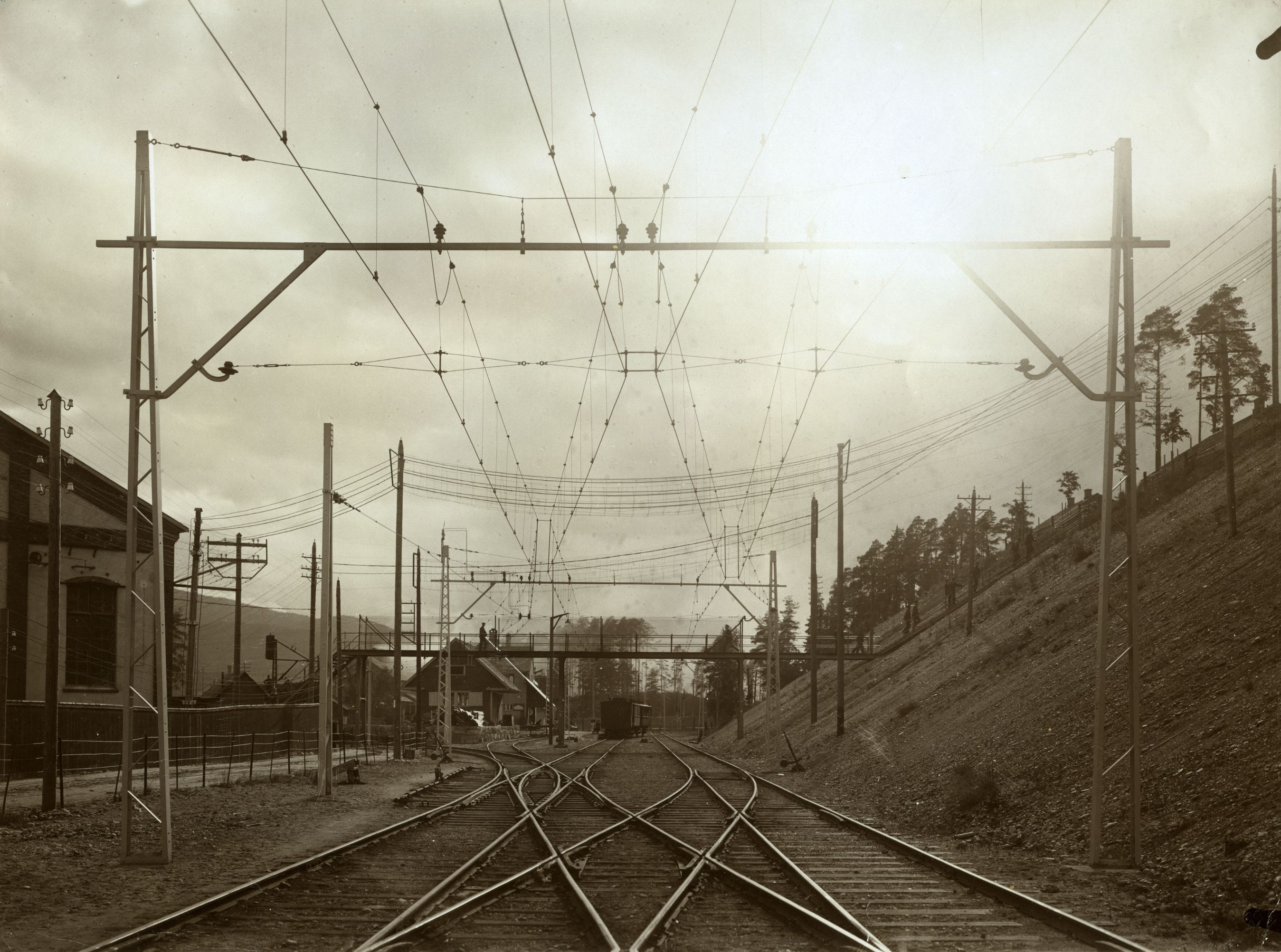
- The station in 1911

General information
- Location: Notodden, Notodden Municipality; Norway
- Coordinates: 59°33′26″N 9°15′53″E
- Elevation: 31.0 m (101.7 ft)
- Owner: Norsk Transport
- Operator: Norsk Transport
- Line: Tinnoset Line
- Distance: 145.72 km (90.55 mi)
- Platforms: 1

Construction
- Architect: Thorvald Astrup

History
- Opened: 9 August 1909
Location

Notodden Old Station (Norwegian: Notodden gamle stasjon) was the railway station serving the town of Notodden in Notodden Municipality, Norway, from 1909 to 1919. The station was designed by Thorvald Astrup as the terminal station of Tinnoset Line. When Notodden was connected with the Bratsberg Line in 1919, Notodden New Station was built, and the old station fell into disuse. Today the station is used as a business park.
