= Høvik =

Coordinates: 59°54′N 10°35′E

Høvik, Bærum, Akershus
- Village
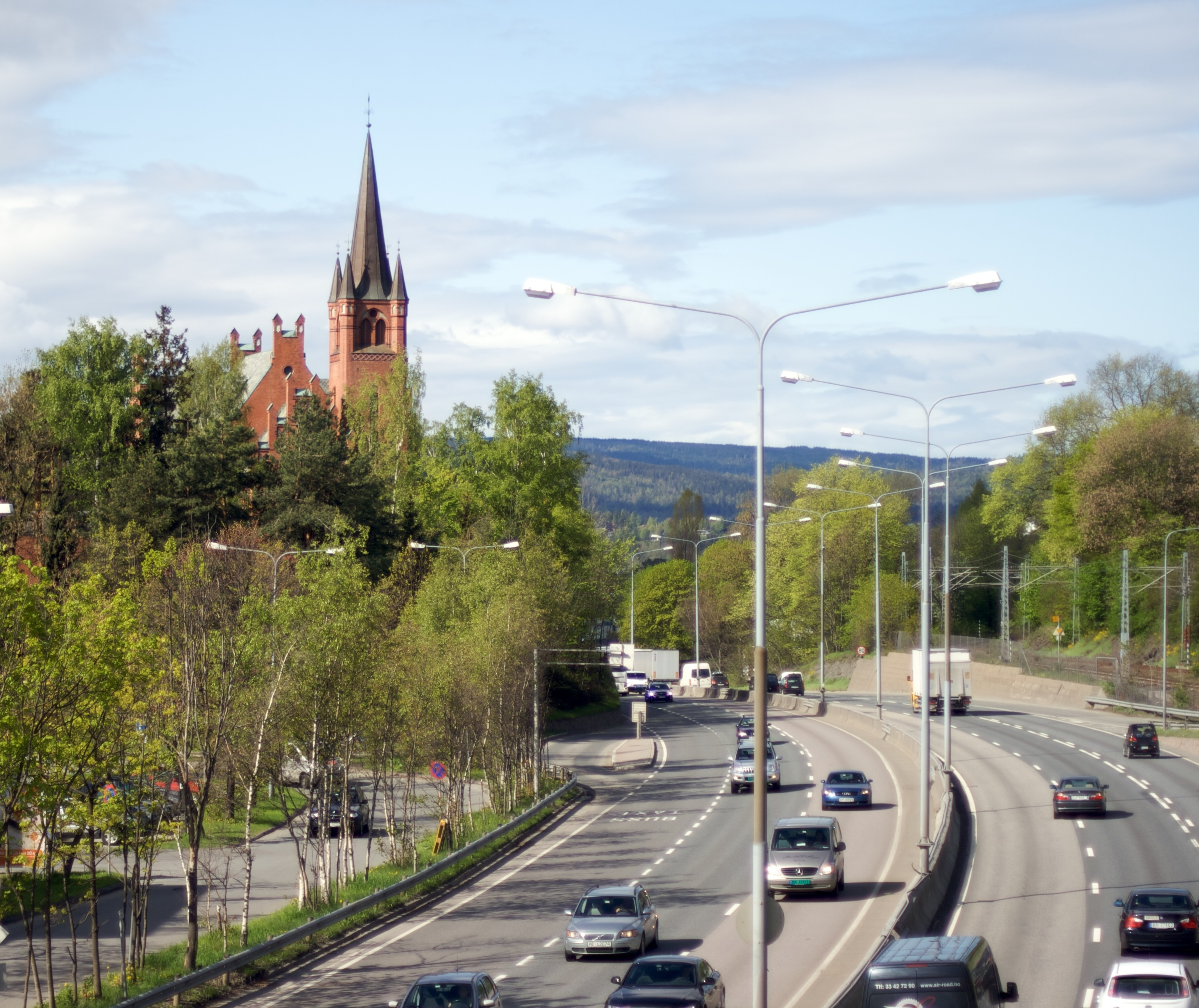
- European route E18 and the local church

- Location in Akershus
- Country: Norway
- Region: Østlandet
- County: Akershus
- Time zone: UTC+01:00 (CET)
  - Summer (DST): UTC+02:00 (CEST)
- Post Code: 1363

Høvik is a suburban area in the municipality of Bærum, Akershus, Norway, within the Oslo metropolitan area. Primarily a residential area, its population was 4,311 in 2005.

Høvik is typically divided into two parts: Nedre (lower) and Øvre (upper).

Høvik features a church, a small shopping area, and a railway station, Høvik Station, which is served by Drammensbanen. The Flytoget (Airport Express Train) does not stop at Høvik. The Henie Onstad Kunstsenter is located nearby. There are three schools in Høvik: Ramstad Skole, Høvik Verk Skole, and Høvik Skole. Several significant businesses also have offices in Høvik, including DNV.

Høvik is home to beaches that are popular and often crowded during the summer. It is a well-known recreational area throughout the year, drawing visitors from across Bærum.

Høvik IF has sections for alpine skiing, bandy, association football and jogging. They compete in the Norwegian Bandy Premier League. In 2016, the men's team reached the quarter-final, while the women's team reached the final.
