= Notodden New Station =

Railway station in Notodden, Norway

Coordinates: 59.5589°N 9.2673°E

Notodden New
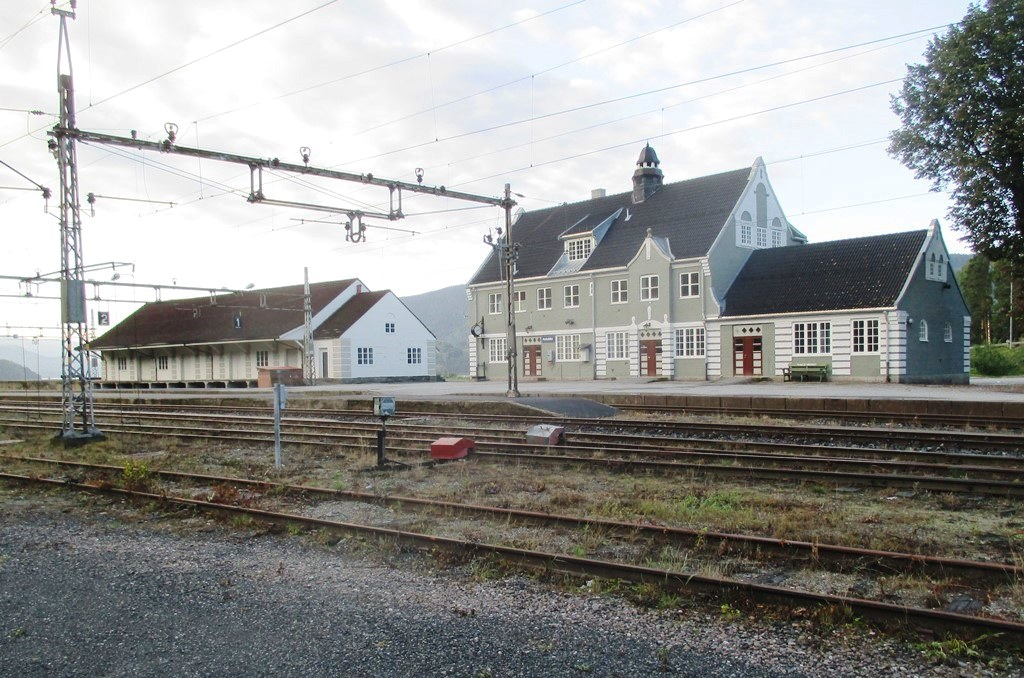

General information
- Location: Notodden, Notodden Municipality; Norway
- Elevation: 31 m (102 ft)
- Owner: Bane NOR
- Operator: Vy
- Line: Tinnoset Line
- Distance: 149.95 km (93.17 mi)
- Platforms: 2

Construction
- Architect: Gudmund Hoel

History
- Opened: 1919
Location

Notodden New Station (Norwegian: Notodden nye stasjon) served Notodden, Norway from 1919 to 2004, and again from 2015 to 2020. The station was designed by Gudmund Hoel, finished in 1917 and taken into use two years later when the Bratsberg Line opened.

The new line needed a higher starting position for the line southwards. The station is 700 meters (0.43 mi) from Notodden Old Station. In 2004 Notodden Public Transport Terminal was created, 800 meters (0.50 mi) further into town.

On December 13 2020, this station on the Tinnoset line was closed, and instead a newer single platform terminal station, close to the site of the original station, came into use. This latest station (with newly track laid to it but without electrification) was renamed Notodden stasjon (from Notodden Gamle stasjon) and is now adjacent to the Public Transport Terminal (Notodden skysstasjon).

Preceding station		Following station
—	Tinnoset Line	Lisleherad
Nordagutu	Bratsberg Line	—
