= Krysset =

Village in Vinje Municipality, Norway

Krysset Krossen
- Village
- Interactive map of Krysset
- Coordinates: 59.69473°N 8.06306°E
- Country: Norway
- Region: Eastern Norway
- County: Telemark
- District: Vest-Telemark
- Municipality: Vinje Municipality

Area
  - Total: 0.94 km^{2} (0.36 sq mi)
- Elevation: 735 m (2,411 ft)

Population (2025)
  - Total: 620
  - Density: 660/km^{2} (1,700/sq mi)
- Time zone: UTC+01:00 (CET)
  - Summer (DST): UTC+02:00 (CEST)
- Post Code: 3864 Rauland

Krysset or Krossen is a village in Vinje Municipality in Telemark county, Norway. The village is located near the eastern shore of the lake Totak, just to the southeast of the village of Raulandsgrend. The municipal centre of Åmot lies about 15 kilometres (9.3 mi) south of Krossen.

The 0.94-square-kilometre (230-acre) village has a population (2025) of 620 and a population density of 660 inhabitants per square kilometre (1,700/sq mi).

== History ==
Krossen has a rich history, with settlement activities dating back to the early medieval period. The area was historically part of the larger administrative district of Vinje Municipality, which has been a significant locality in Telemark county for centuries. The establishment of the Holum Church in 1825 marks an important development in the village's history, serving as a central place of worship and community gathering.

=== Name ===
Historically, the name was Krossen, but in 2025, the name was changed to Krysset, although Krossen is still an accepted name, but Krysset is the preferred name.
