= Nesland, Vinje =

Village in Vinje Municipality, Norway

Nesland
- Village
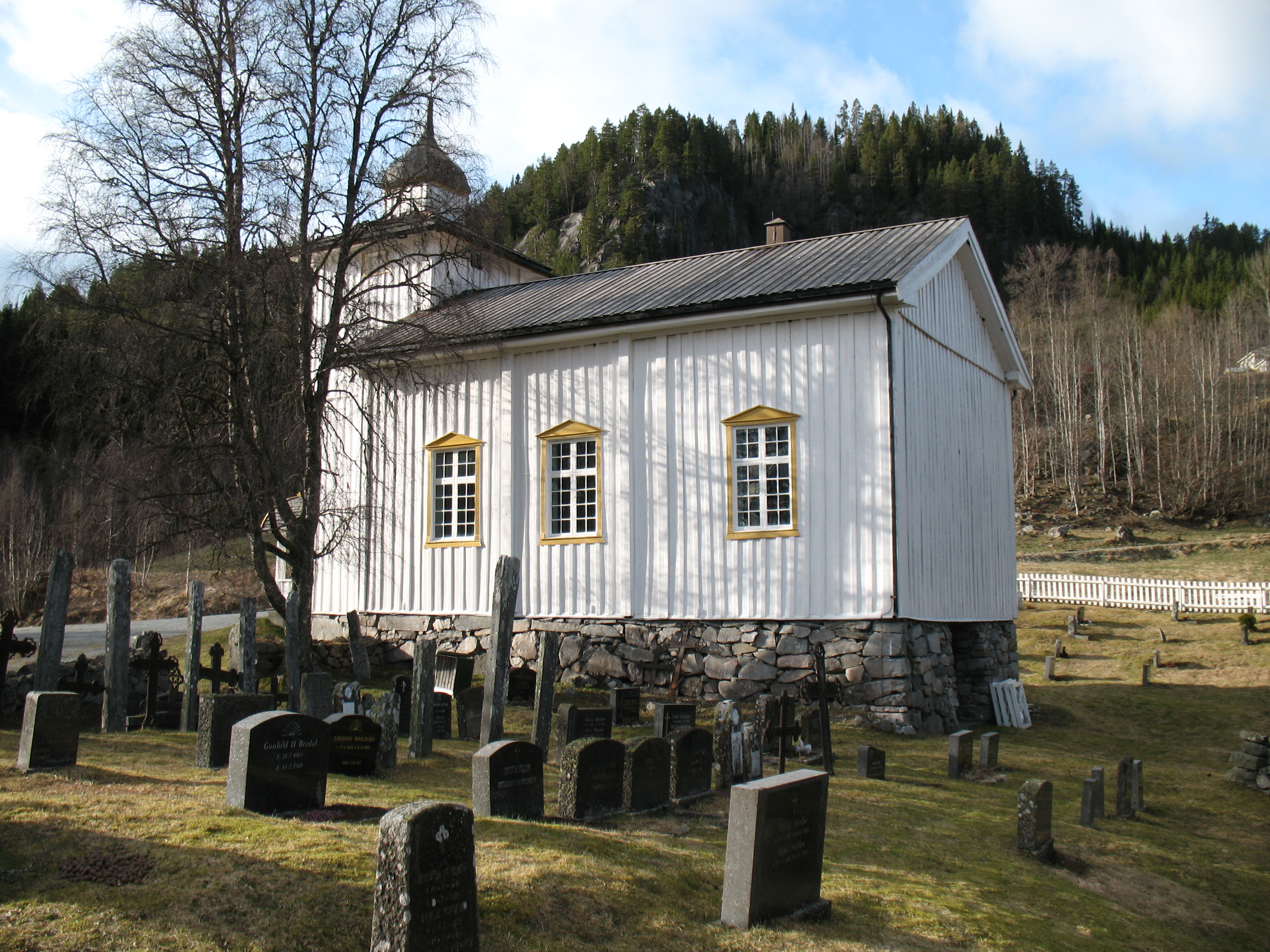
- View of the village church
- Interactive map of Nesland
- Coordinates: 59.52385°N 7.98594°E
- Country: Norway
- Region: Eastern Norway
- County: Telemark
- District: Vest-Telemark
- Municipality: Vinje Municipality
- Elevation: 426 m (1,398 ft)
- Time zone: UTC+01:00 (CET)
  - Summer (DST): UTC+02:00 (CEST)
- Post Code: 3890 Vinje

Nesland is a village in Vinje Municipality in Telemark county, Norway. The village is located in the southern part of the municipality, along the river Tokke, about 8 kilometres (5.0 mi) to the south of the village of Åmot. The village of Dalen (in Tokke Municipality) lies about 10 kilometres (6.2 mi) to the south. Nesland Church is located in the village.
