= Tokke =

Tokke may refer to:

- Tokke Municipality, a municipality in Telemark county, Norway
- Tokke (river), a river in Telemark county, Norway
- Tokke, also spelled Toke, a lake in Telemark county, Norway
- Tokke Hydroelectric Power Station, a hydroelectric power plant in Telemark county, Norway
- Tokke prestegjeld, a former geographic subdivision of the Church of Norway in Telemark county, Norway
