= Skien watershed =

River system in Norway

Coordinates: 59°33′30″N 8°24′24″E

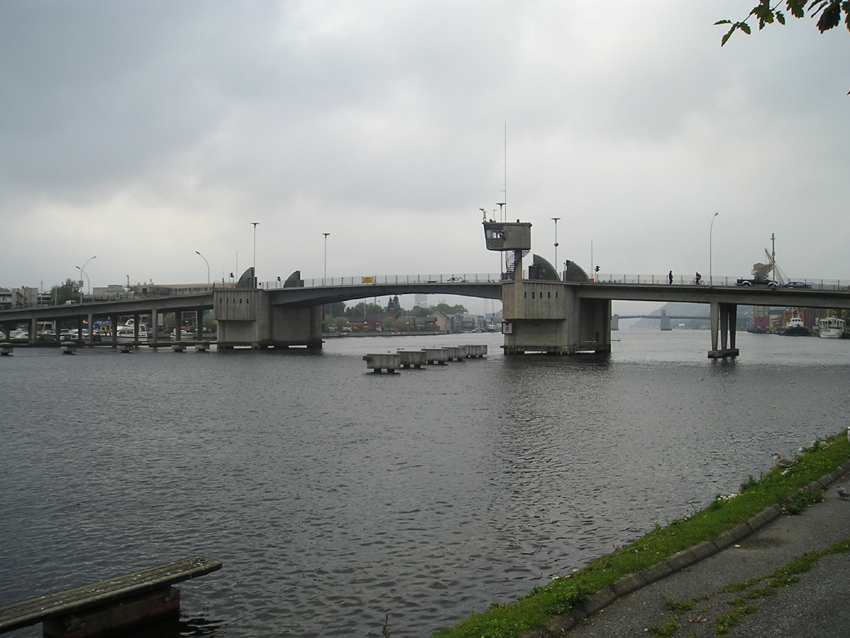
The Skien watershed has its mouth under the bridges in Porsgrunn, where it drains into the Frierfjord

The Skien watershed is the third largest watershed of Norway after those of the Glomma and the Drammen rivers. The catchment area is 10,780 square kilometres (4,160 mi^{2}), and the maximum length is 252 kilometres (157 mi).

The Skien watershed includes rivers which feed Lake Norsjø above Skien;

- Vinje-Tokke watershed, which includes lakes Totak, Bandak, Kviteseidvatn and Flåvatn. Tokke River rises from Lake Totak in Vinje Municipality.
- Bøelva watershed, which includes lakes Sundsbarmvatn and Seljordsvatn. Bøelva flows into Lake Norsjø at Årnesbukta.
- Tinnelva watershed, which includes the lakes Møsvatn, Kalhovdfjorden, Lake Tinn and Heddalsvatn as well as the Hjartdøla River.

The Skien River (Skienselva) begins in Skotfoss in Skien Municipality, at the Telemark Canal's first lock, and runs through Porsgrunn to the mouth of the river at Frierfjord at Norsk Hydro's factory complex.

The Skien watershed is heavily regulated for power production and large parts are channeled. The Telemark Canal connects Skien to Dalen at the delta where Tokke River flows into the west end of the Lake Bandak. The canal links the long lakes of Norsjø, Flåvatn, Kviteseidvatn and Bandak using a series of eight locks. Norsjø-Skien Canal, with locks in Skien and by Løveid, was built in 1854–61 and is the oldest of the two channels. This channel connects with Bryggevannet harbor in Skien, and Frierfjord in Bamble Municipality. Bandak-Norsjø Canal is the second original channel and was opened in 1892.

== Other sources ==
- Eie, Jon Arne; Per Einar Faugli; Jens Aabel (1996) Elver og vann. Vern av norske vassdrag (Grøndahl Dreyer) ISBN 82-504-2241-4
