= Songavatnet =

Lake in Telemark, Norway

- Songevatnet; Songavatn
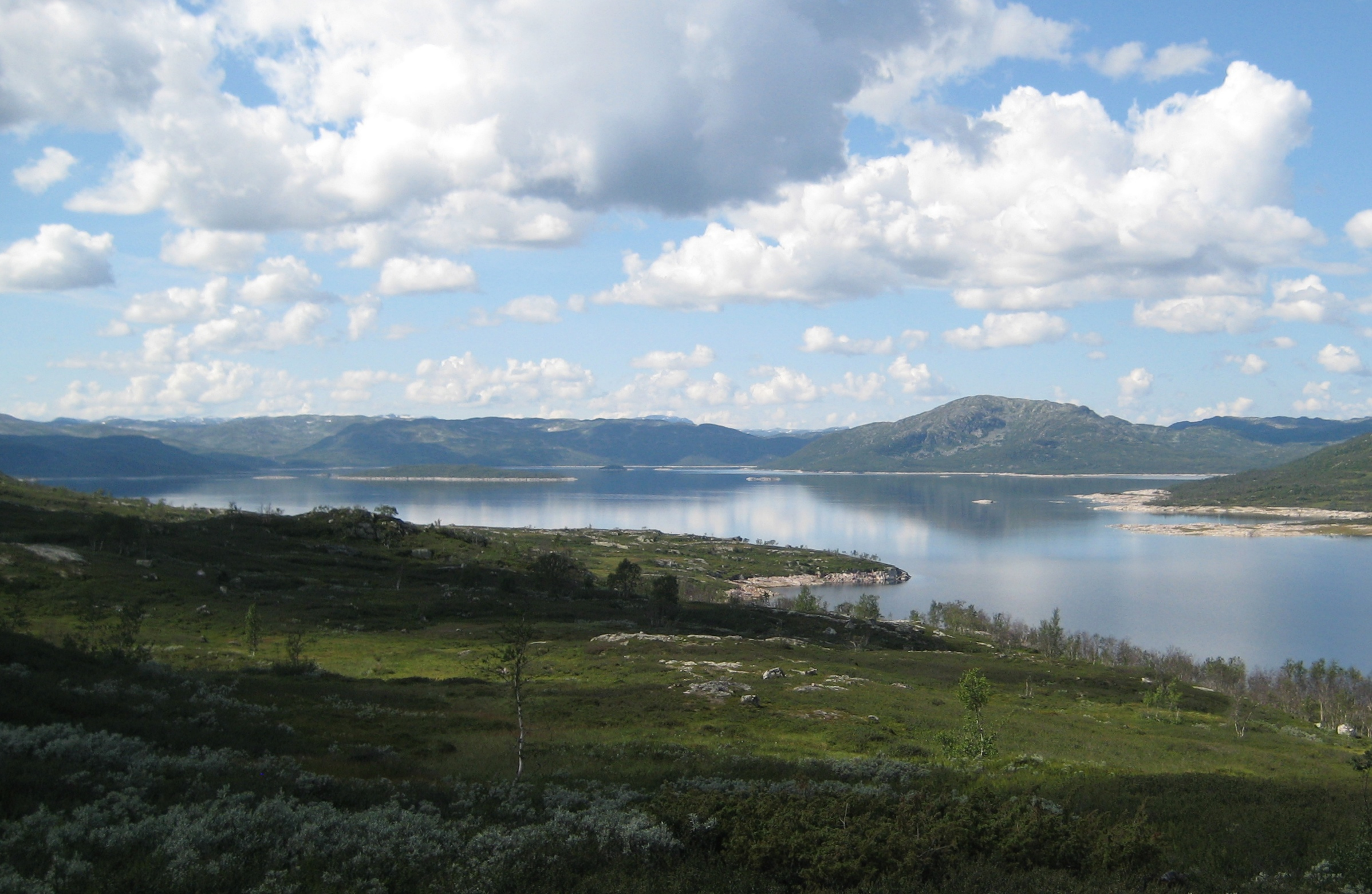
- View of the lake
- Interactive map of Songavatnet
- Location: Vinje Municipality, Telemark
- Coordinates: 59.8515°N 7.50838°E
- Primary outflows: Songa river
- Catchment area: 384 km^{2} (148 sq mi)
- Basin countries: Norway
- Max. length: 14.3 kilometres (8.9 mi)
- Max. width: 5 kilometres (3.1 mi)
- Surface area: 29.86 km^{2} (11.53 sq mi)
- Max. depth: 21 metres (69 ft)
- Surface elevation: 974 metres (3,196 ft)
- References: NVE

Songavatnet is a lake in Vinje Municipality in Telemark county, Norway. It has a surface area of 29.86 square kilometres (11.53 sq mi) and lies at an elevation of 974 metres (3,196 ft). The lake lies just south of the border of Hardangervidda National Park and just southeast of the mountain Vassdalseggi. The villages of Haukeli and Edland are both located about 9 kilometres (5.6 mi) to the south of the lake and the village of Arabygdi lies about 10 kilometres (6.2 mi) to the southeast of the lake. The lake flows out into the river Songa which flows to the southeast into the nearby lake Totak.

Songavatnet has two dams: Trolldalsdammen and Songadammen. Both are rock-fill dams with a sealing core of moraine mass. The larger dam, Songadammen, measures 1,050 metres (3,440 ft) long and 37 metres (121 ft) high. The two dams on the south end of the lake are used to regulate the surface elevation of the mountain lake so that it can be used for hydroelectric power production. This was the largest dam in Northern Europe at the time it was completed in the 1960s. The stored energy content of the reservoir is 1.4 terawatt-hours (5.0 PJ).

== Media gallery ==
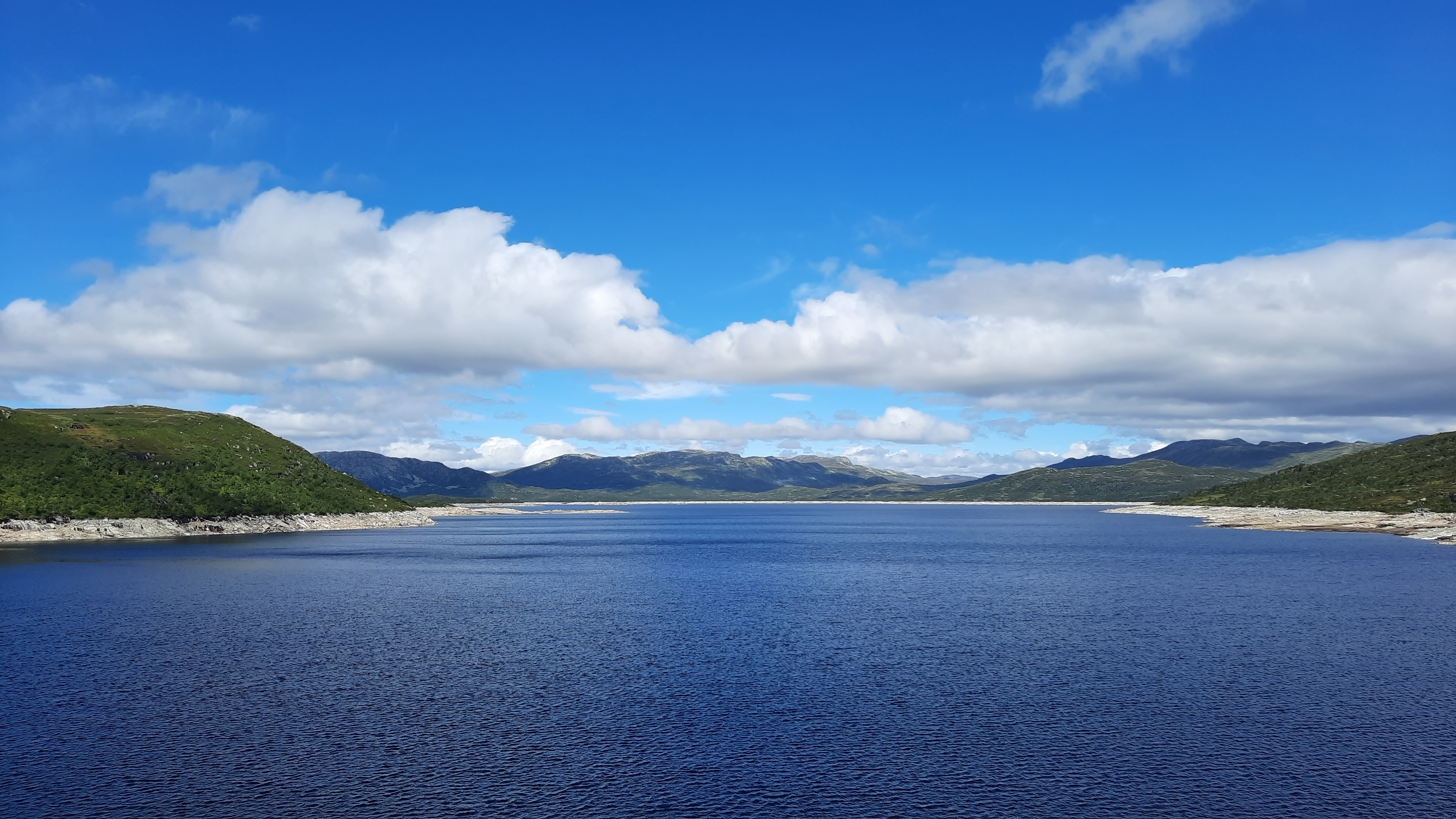
View of the lake

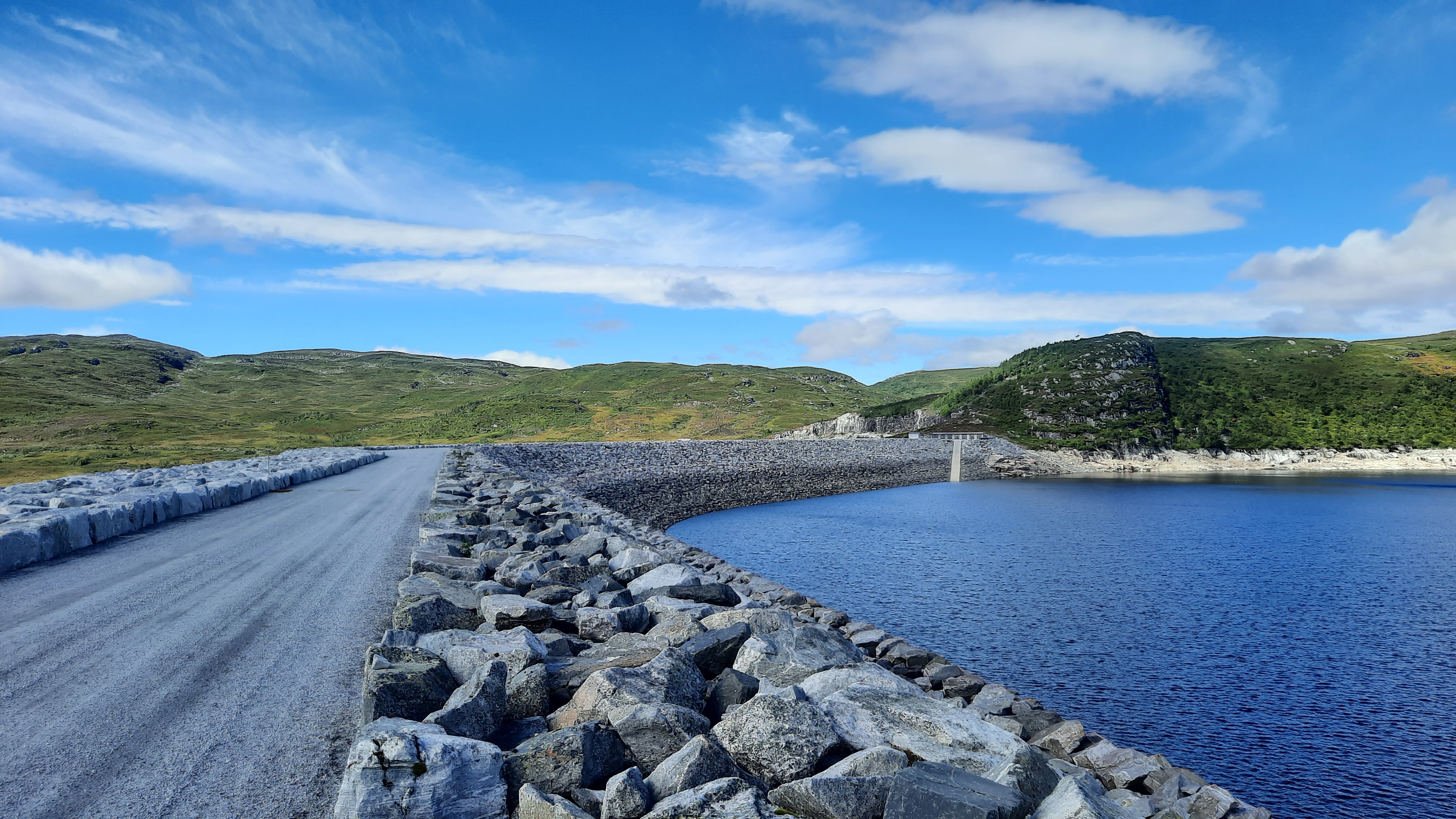
Songadammen from the east

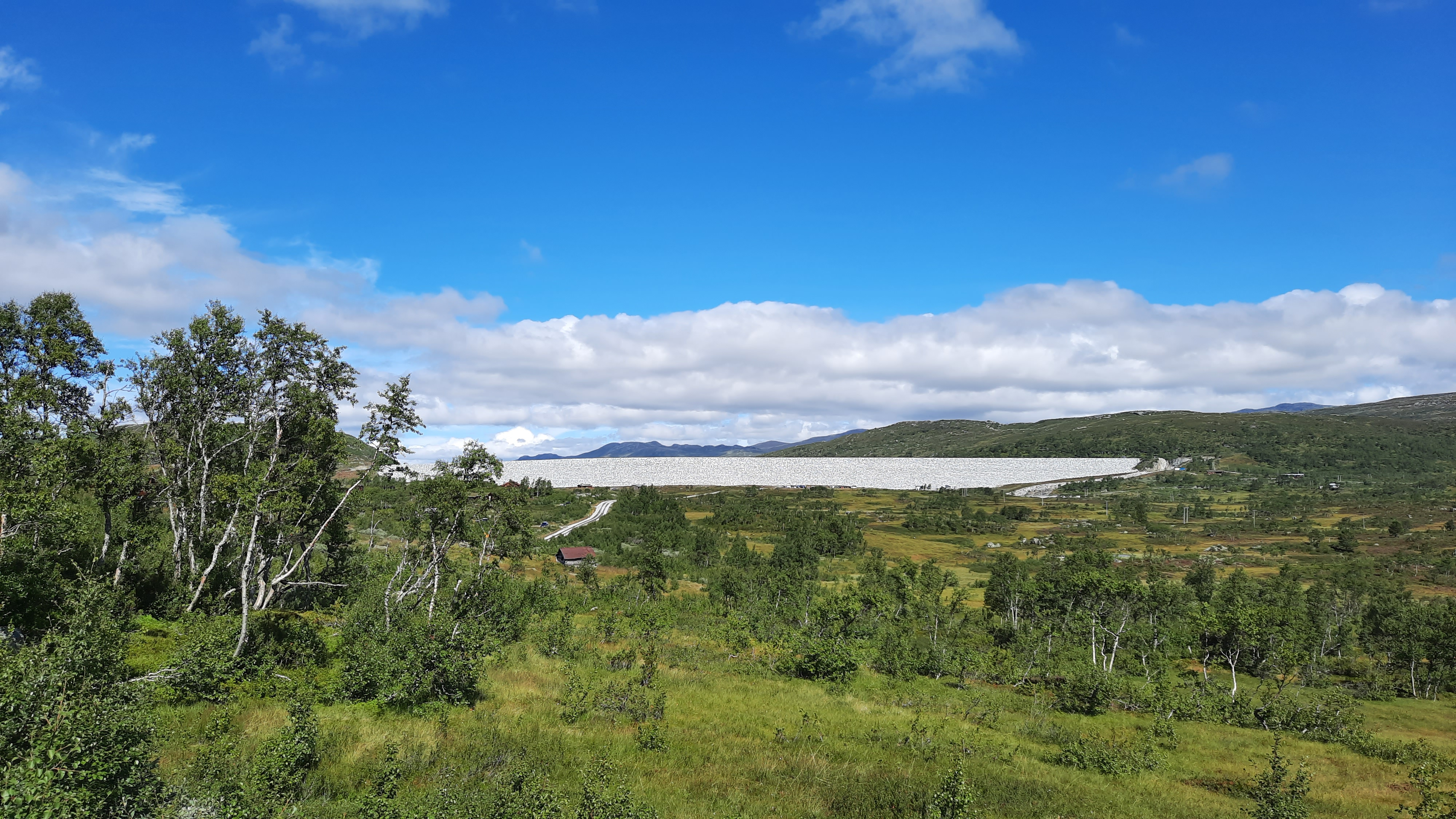
Songadammen from the south

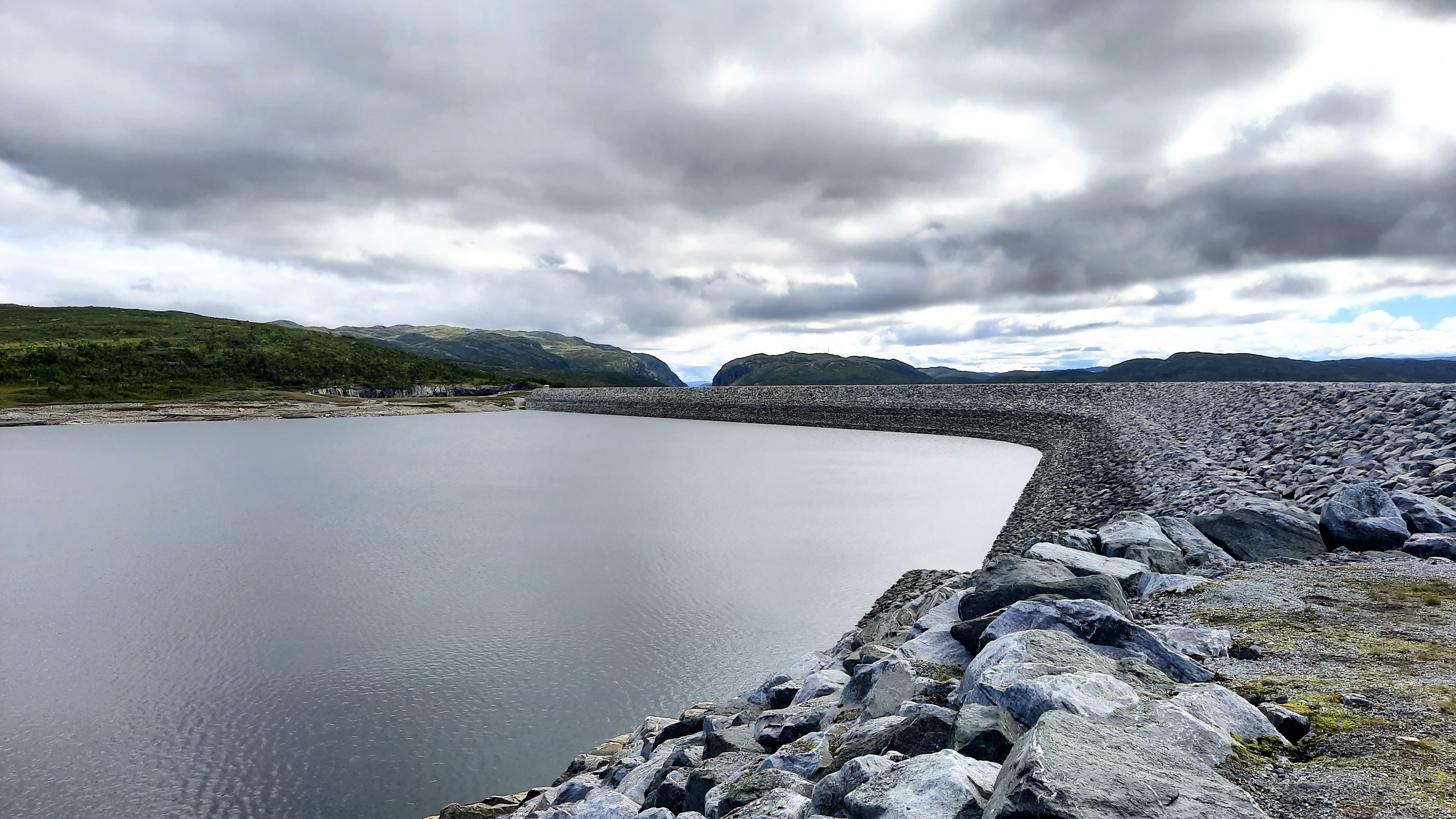
Songadammen from the west

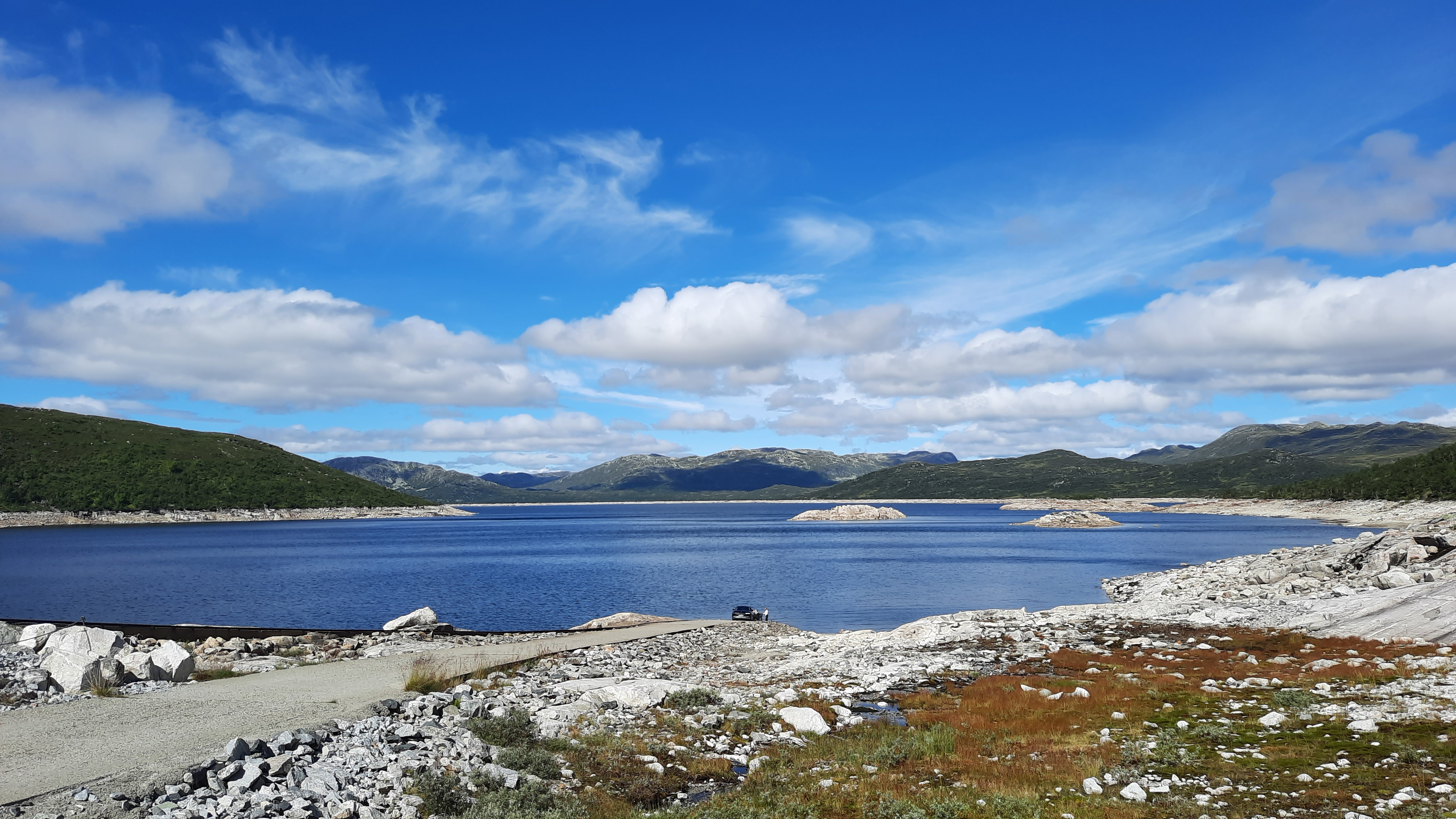
View from the Trolldalsdammen

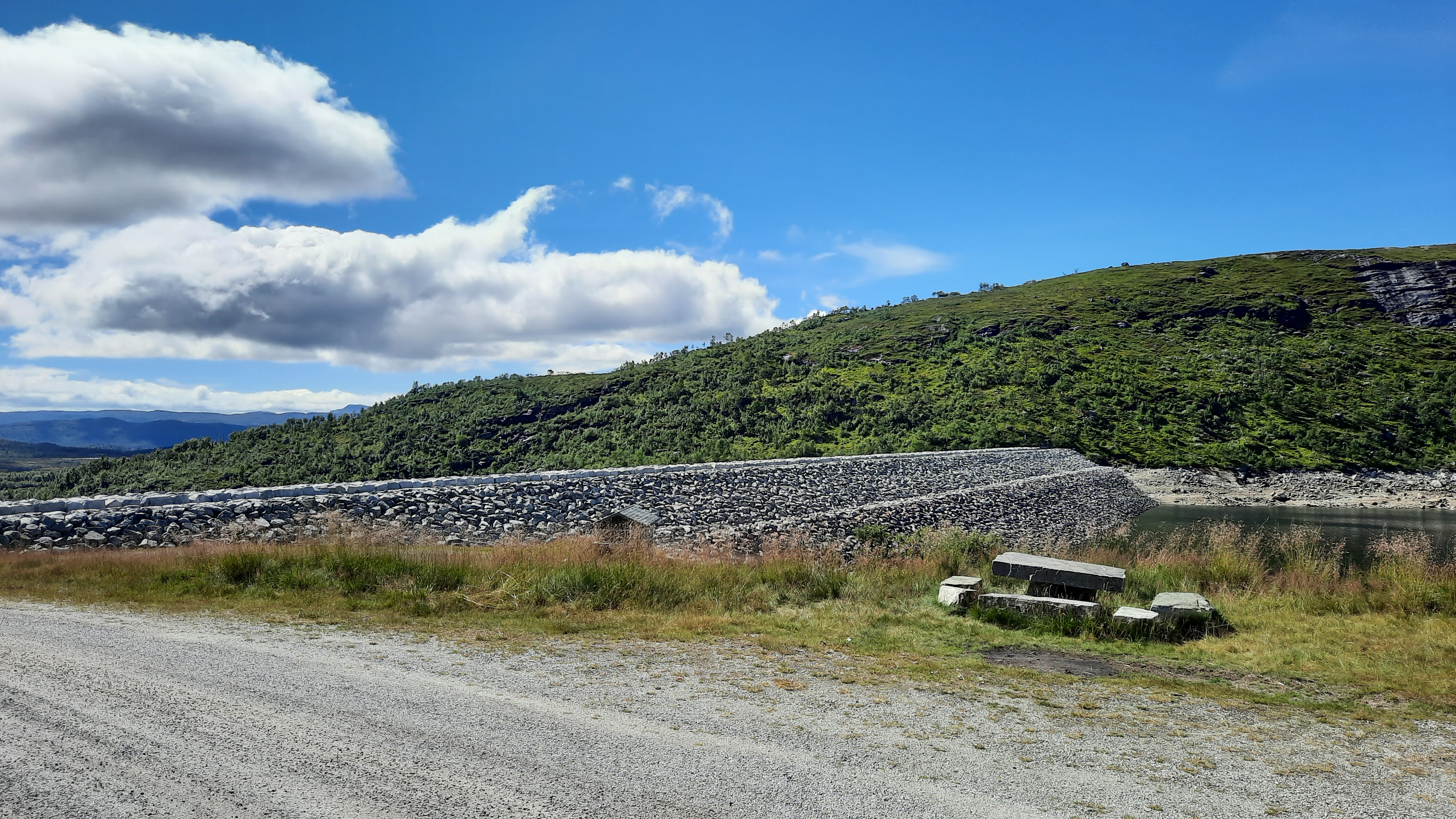
Trolldalsdammen from the east

== See also ==
- List of lakes in Norway
