= Vinjeåi =

River in Telemark, Norway

Location
- Country: Norway
- County: Telemark
- Municipalities: Vinje Municipality

Physical characteristics
- Source: Vinjevatn
  - location: Tveitogrend, Vinje Municipality
  - coordinates: 59.5700369°N 7.9565443°E
  - elevation: 466 metres (1,529 ft)
- Mouth: Tokke river
  - location: Åmot, Vinje Municipality
  - coordinates: 59.565643°N 7.9984491°E
  - elevation: 426 metres (1,398 ft)
- Length: 2.6 km (1.6 mi)
- Basin size: 919 km^{2} (355 sq mi)
- Discharge
  - average: 40 m^{3}/s (1,400 cu ft/s)

Vinjeåi is a river in Vinje Municipality in Telemark county, Norway. The 2.6-kilometre (1.6 mi) long river starts at the southeastern end of the lake Vinjevatn where the water flows out into the river. The river flows downstream and end when it joins the river Tokke at the village of Åmot. Vinjeåi was regulated as part of the Tokke hydroelectric power development in the 1960s, and water from Vinjevatn is transferred through tunnel to the Tokke Hydroelectric Power Station.

== See also ==
- List of rivers in Norway
