= Vinjevatn =

Lake in Telemark, Norway

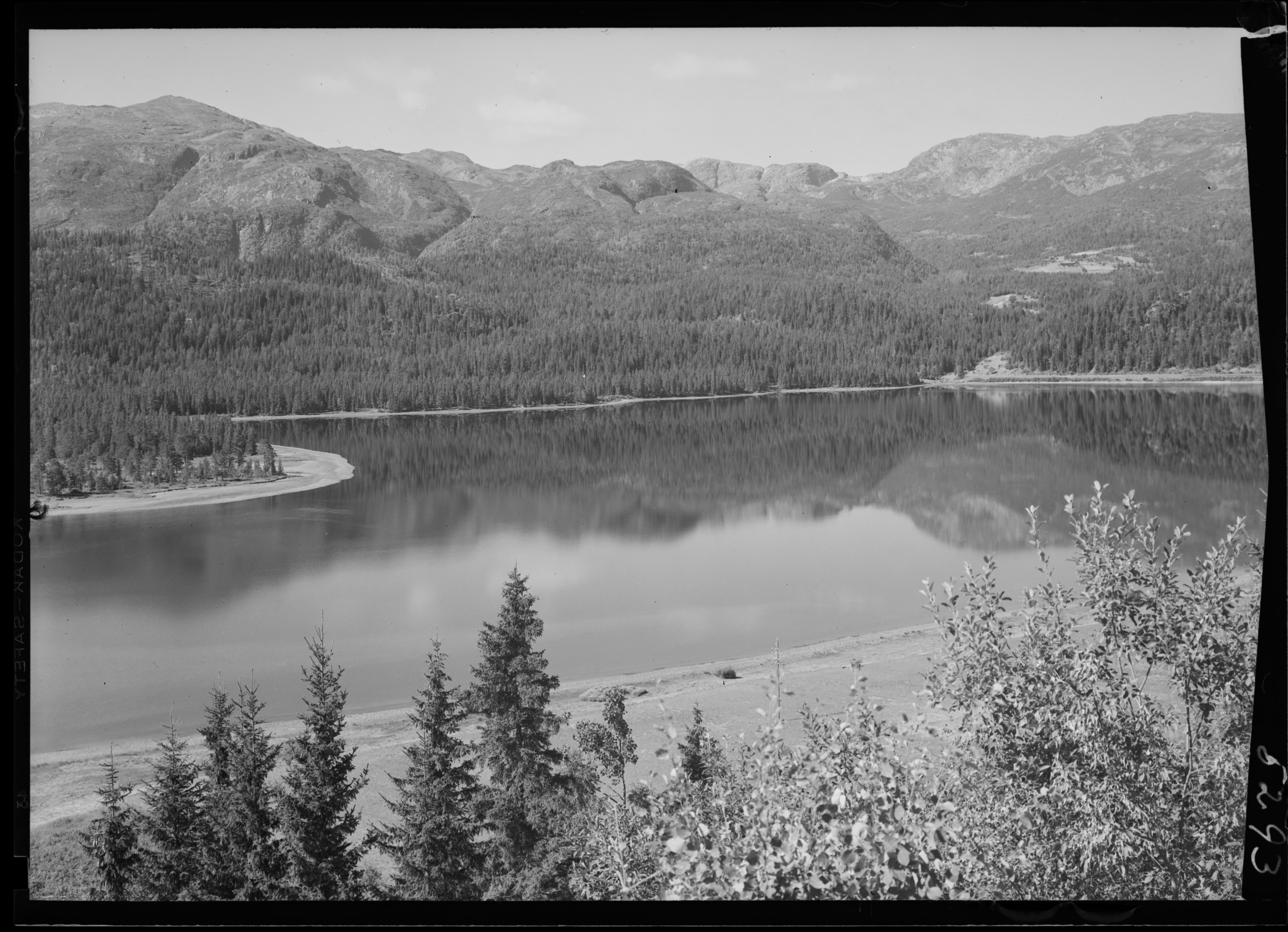
- View of the lake (c. 1948)
- Interactive map of Vinjevatn
- Location: Vinje Municipality, Telemark
- Coordinates: 59.60844°N 7.85405°E
- Catchment area: 906 km^{2} (350 sq mi)
- Basin countries: Norway
- Max. length: 9.5 kilometres (5.9 mi)
- Max. width: 1.1 kilometres (0.68 mi)
- Surface area: 3.3 km^{2} (1.3 sq mi)
- Max. depth: 35.5 metres (116 ft)
- Water volume: 21,747,000 m^{3} (17,631 acre⋅ft)
- Surface elevation: 466 metres (1,529 ft)
- References: NVE

Vinjevatn is a lake in Vinje Municipality in Telemark county, Norway. The 3.3-square-kilometre (1.3 sq mi) lake lies a short distance to the northwest of the village of Åmot. The village of Vinje lies at the north end of the lake. The main natural influx comes from the river Smørkleppåi, and the lake drains through the river Vinjeåi which meets the river Tokke at Åmot. The lake is part of the Skien watershed. The European route E134 highway runs along the northern shore of the lake.

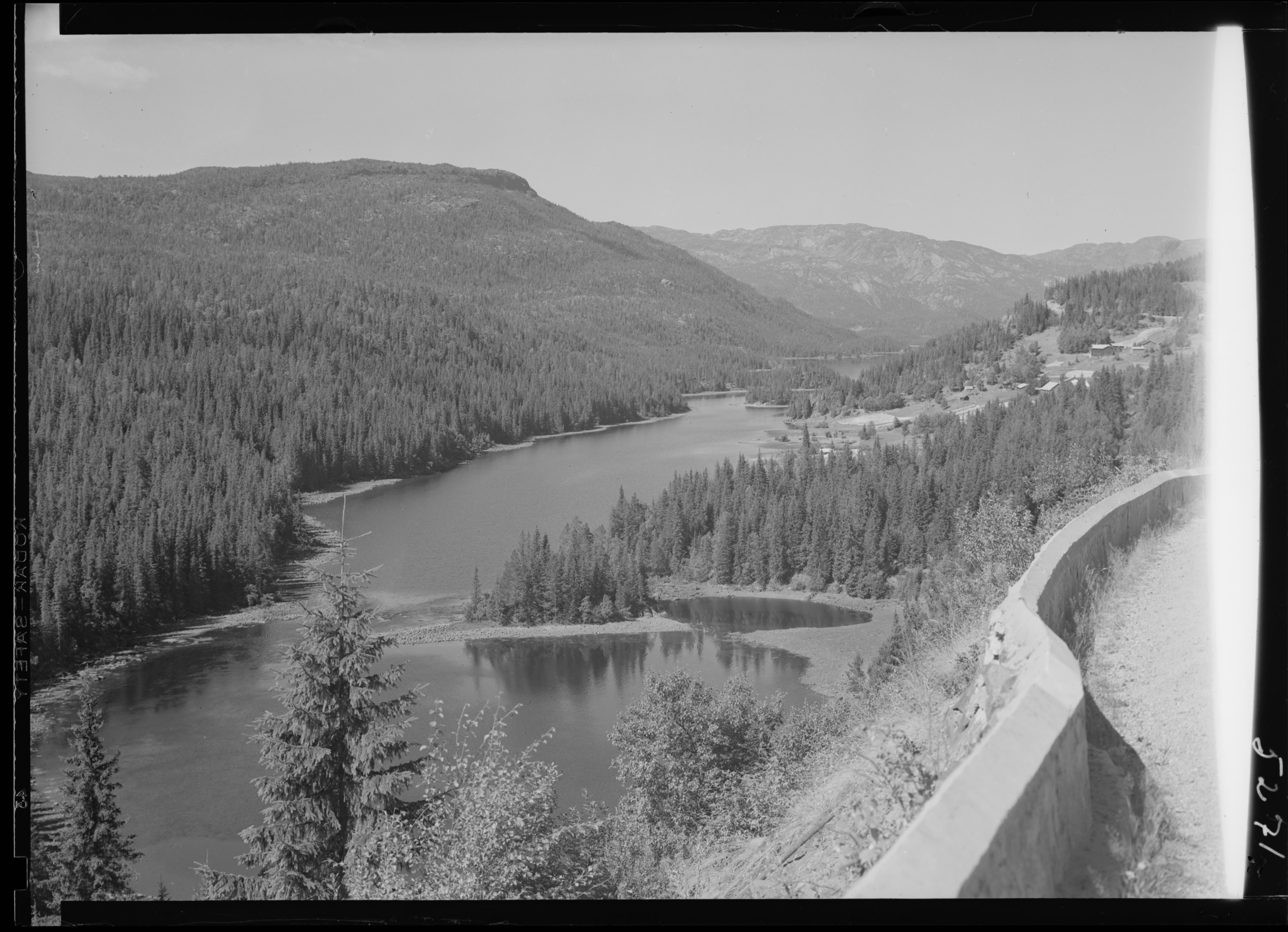
View of the lake (c. 1948)

The lake Vinjevatn has a dam at the southeastern end of the lake. The dam regulates the surface elevation of the lake for hydroelectric power plants nearby. The lake also receives water from the larger lake Totak to the north and it is used as a reservoir for the Vinje Hydroelectric Power Station.

== See also ==
- List of lakes in Norway
