= Totak =

Lake in Telemark, Norway

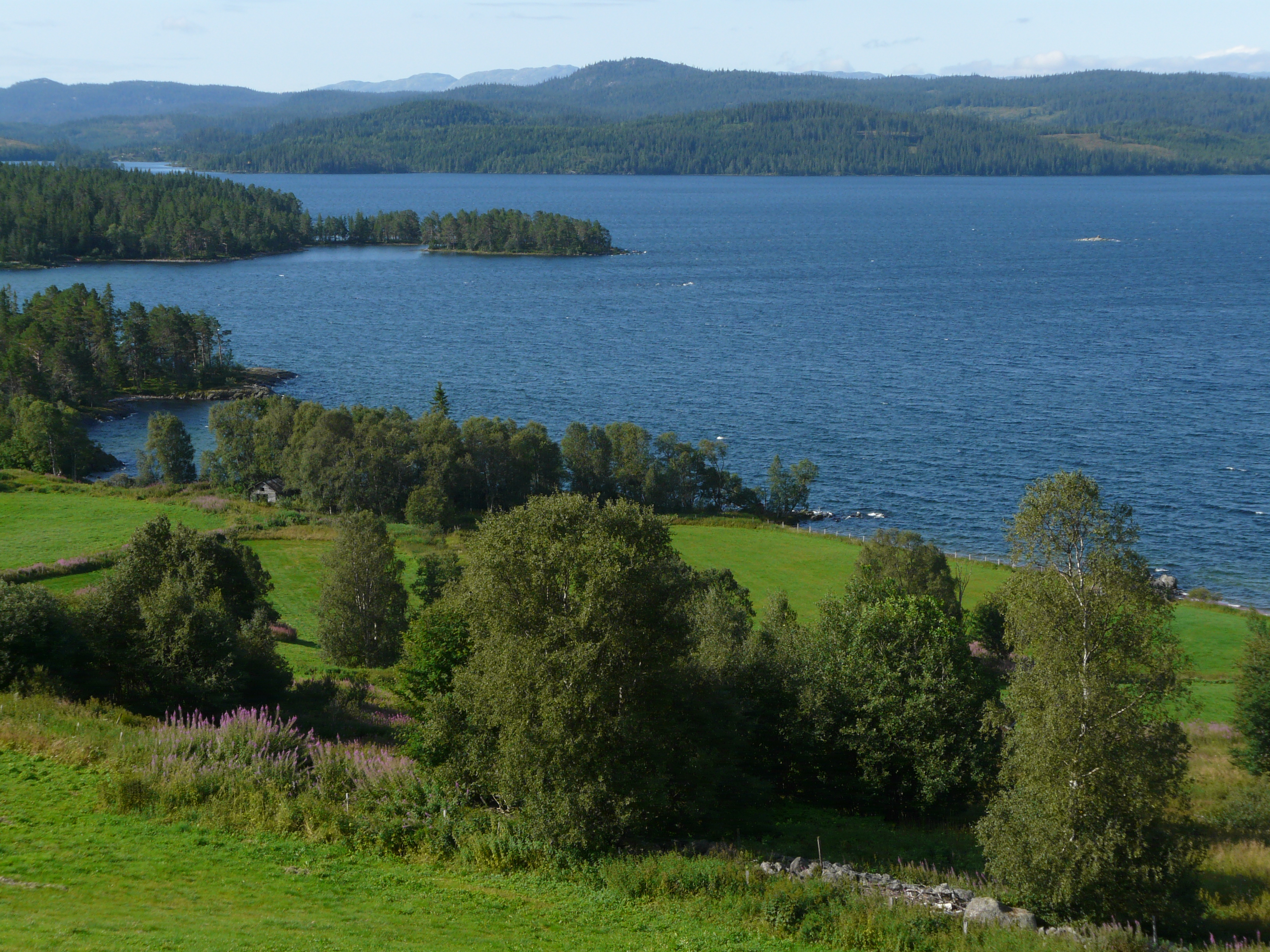
- Interactive map of Totak
- Location: Vinje Municipality, Telemark
- Coordinates: 59.70156°N 7.98258°E
- Type: glacier / mountain lake
- Primary inflows: Bitu, Gravdøla, Kvikkeåi, Songa river (from Songavatnet), Tansåi and Vååi
- Primary outflows: Tokke river (to Bandak)
- Catchment area: 855.49 km^{2} (330.31 sq mi)
- Basin countries: Norway
- Max. length: 23 km (14 mi)
- Max. width: 5 km (3.1 mi)
- Surface area: 37.26 km^{2} (14.39 sq mi)
- Average depth: 63 m (207 ft)
- Max. depth: 306 m (1,004 ft)
- Water volume: 2.35 km^{3} (0.56 cu mi)
- Shore length^{1}: 70.5 kilometres (43.8 mi)
- Surface elevation: 687 m (2,254 ft)
- References: NVE
- ^{1} Shore length is not a well-defined measure.

Totak is a lake in Vinje Municipality in Telemark county, Norway. The 37.26-square-kilometre (14.39 sq mi) lake is located in the Rauland area, about 10 kilometres (6.2 mi) to the north of the village of Åmot. The lake is part of the Skien river watershed (Skiensvassdraget), discharging via the river Tokke which flows into the lake Bandak to the south. At 306 metres (1,004 ft) deep, Totak is the 11th deepest lake in Norway. This tremendous overdeepening marks it as a glacially formed lake with characteristics similar to a fjord. Its volume of 2.35 cubic kilometres (1,910,000 acre⋅ft) makes it the 24th largest by volume as well. Totak is Norway's deepest lake that is not a cryptodepression. The lake's basin is well over sealevel. The lake is a reservoir that holds water for the Tokke Hydroelectric Power Station.

== Media gallery ==
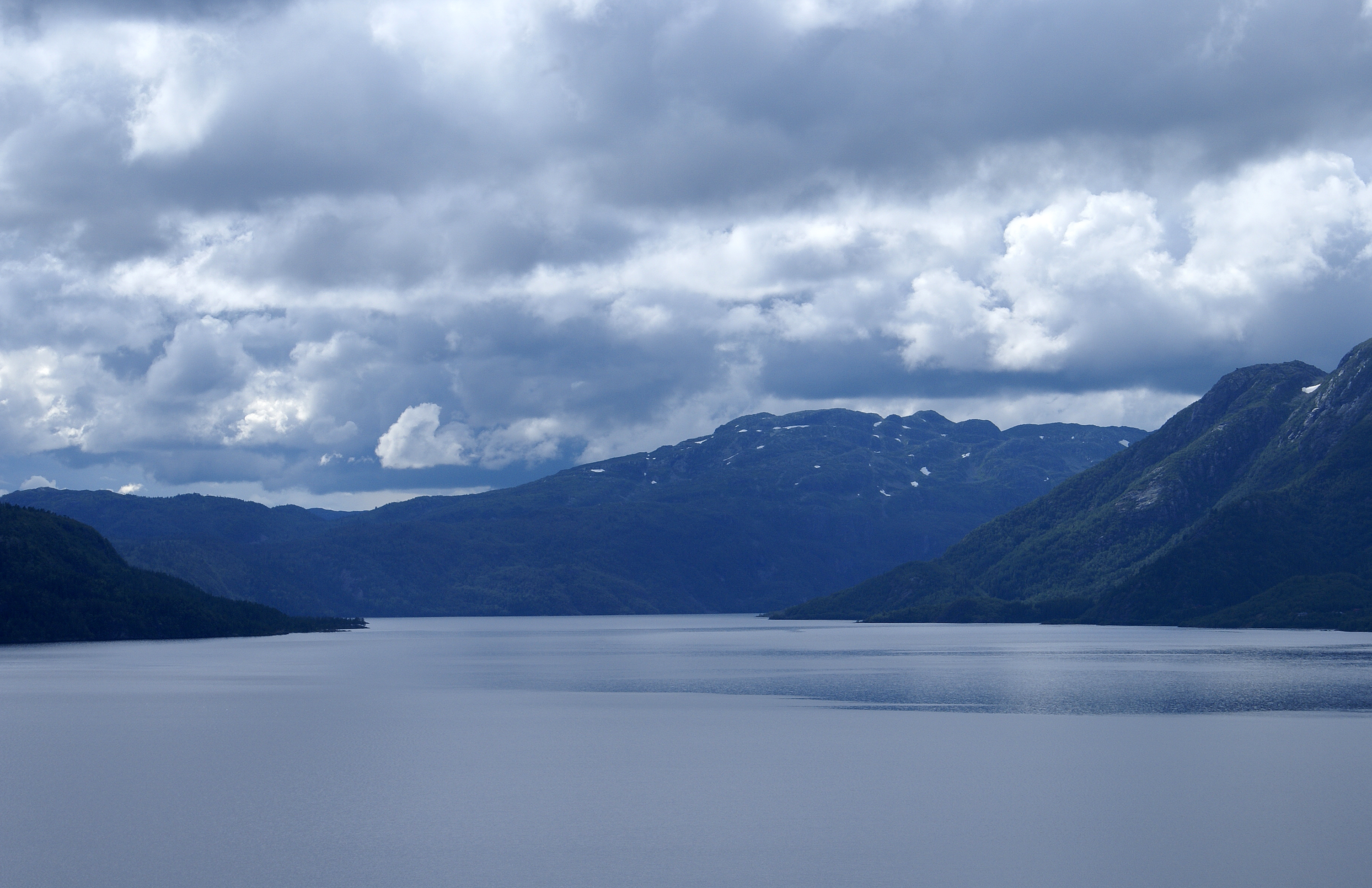

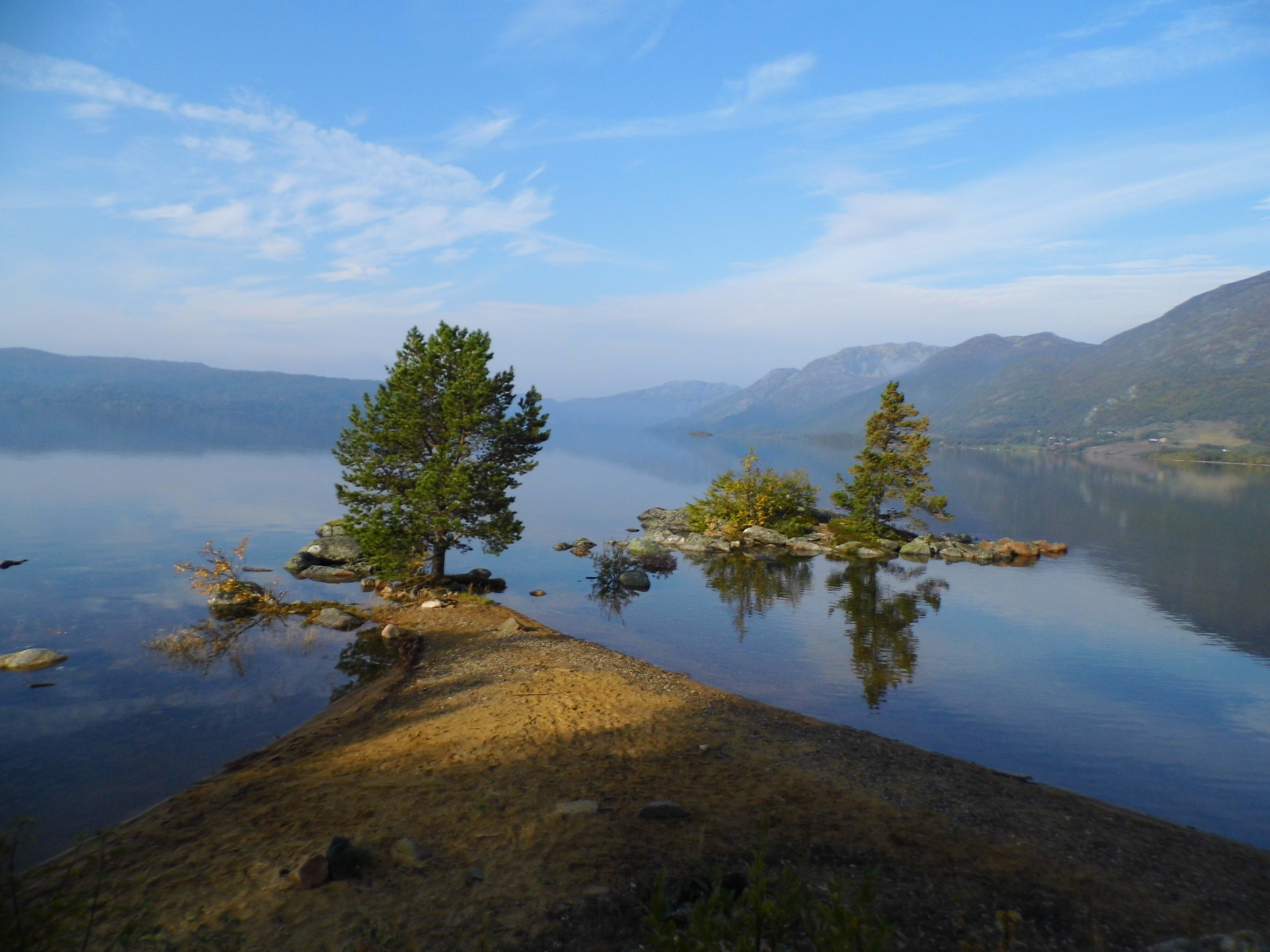

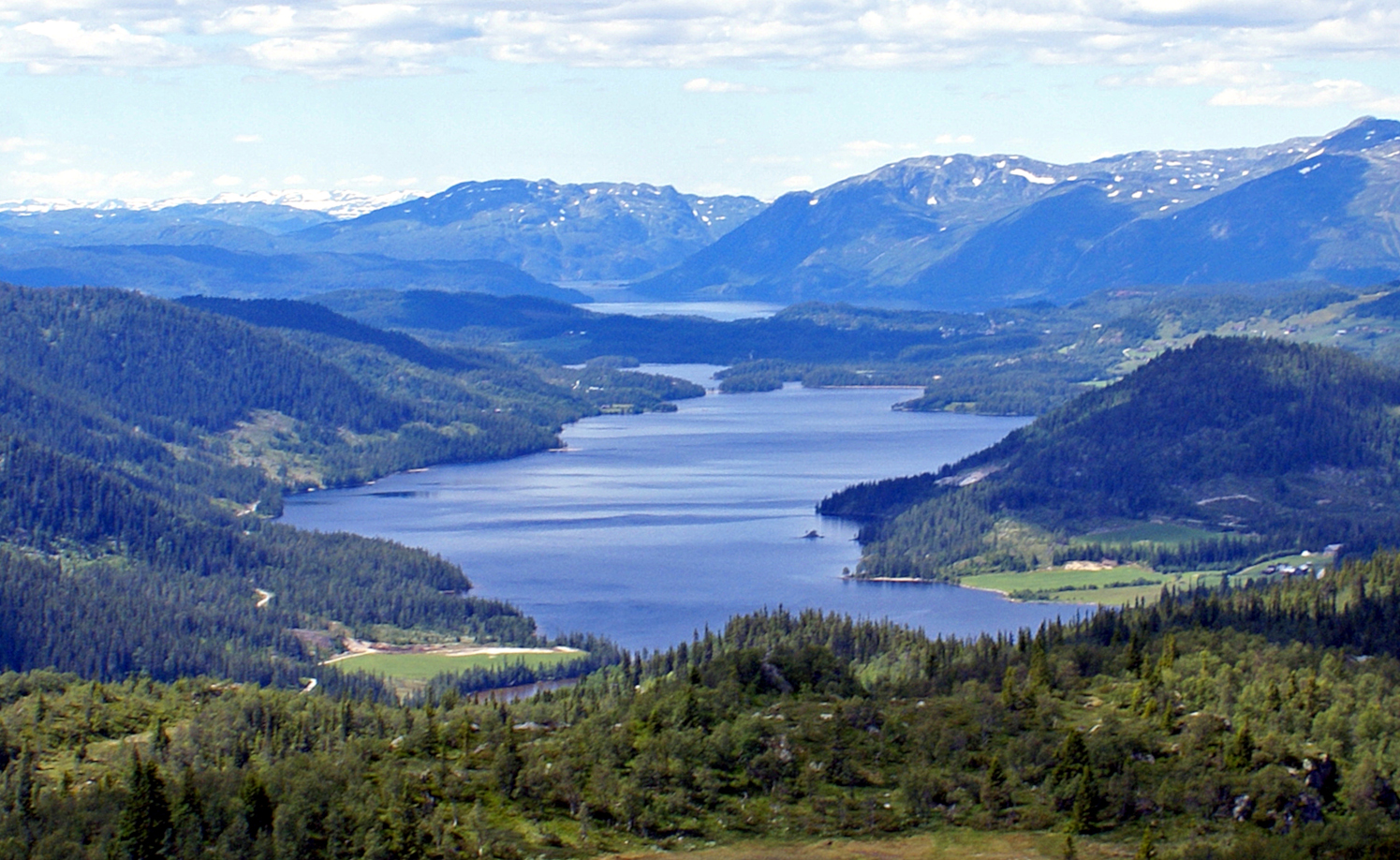

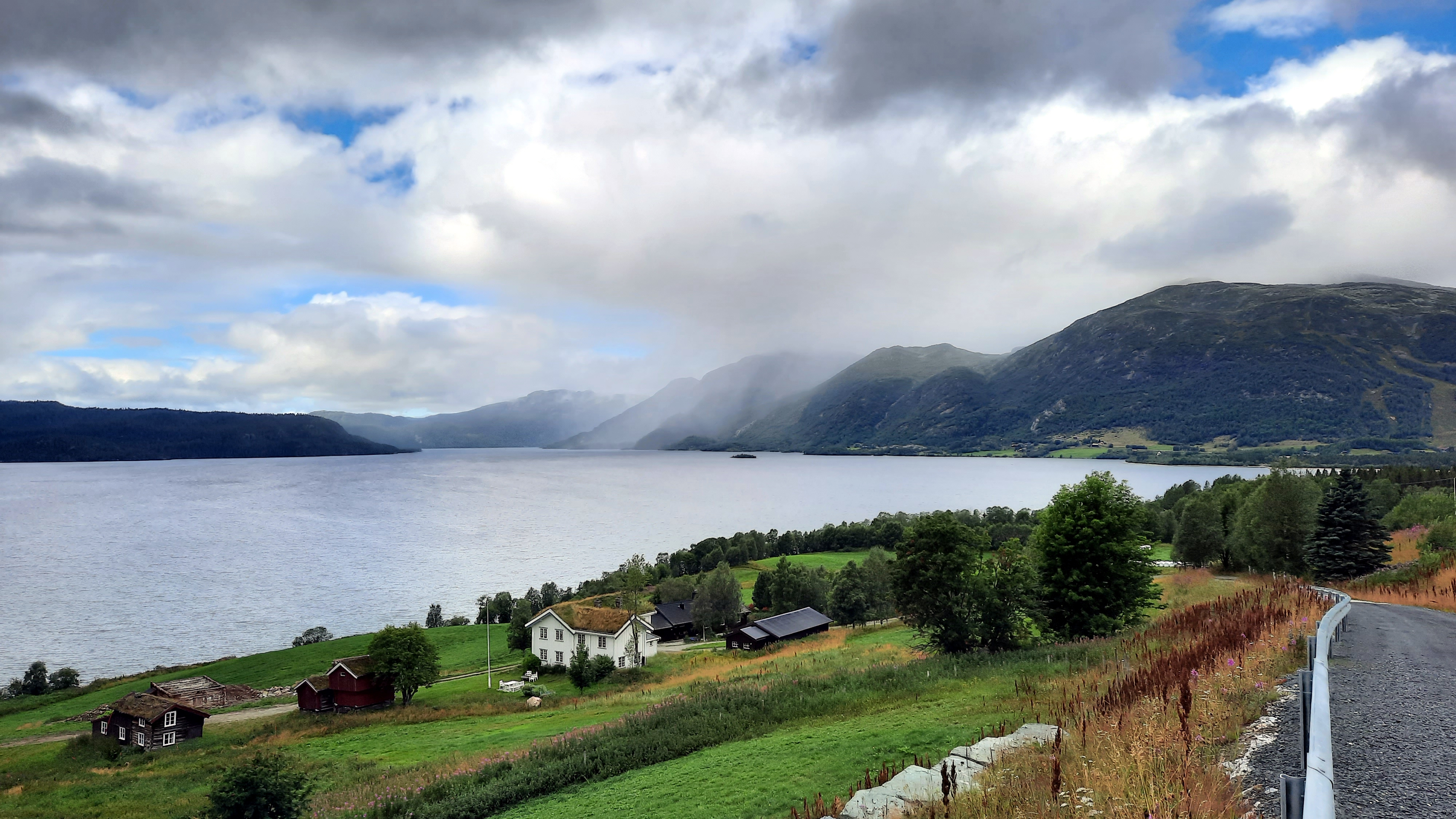

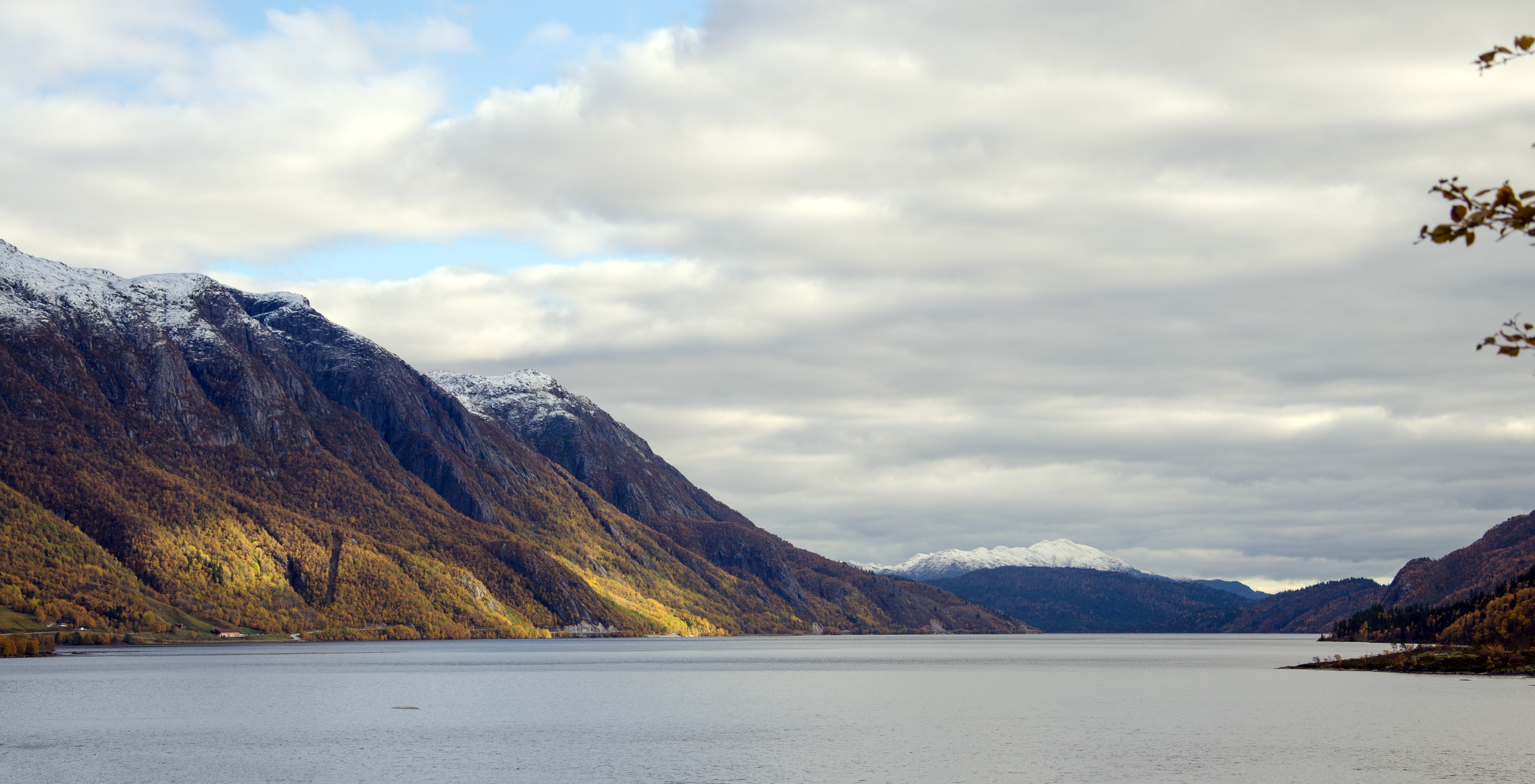

== See also ==
- List of lakes in Norway
