= Vinje Hydroelectric Power Station =

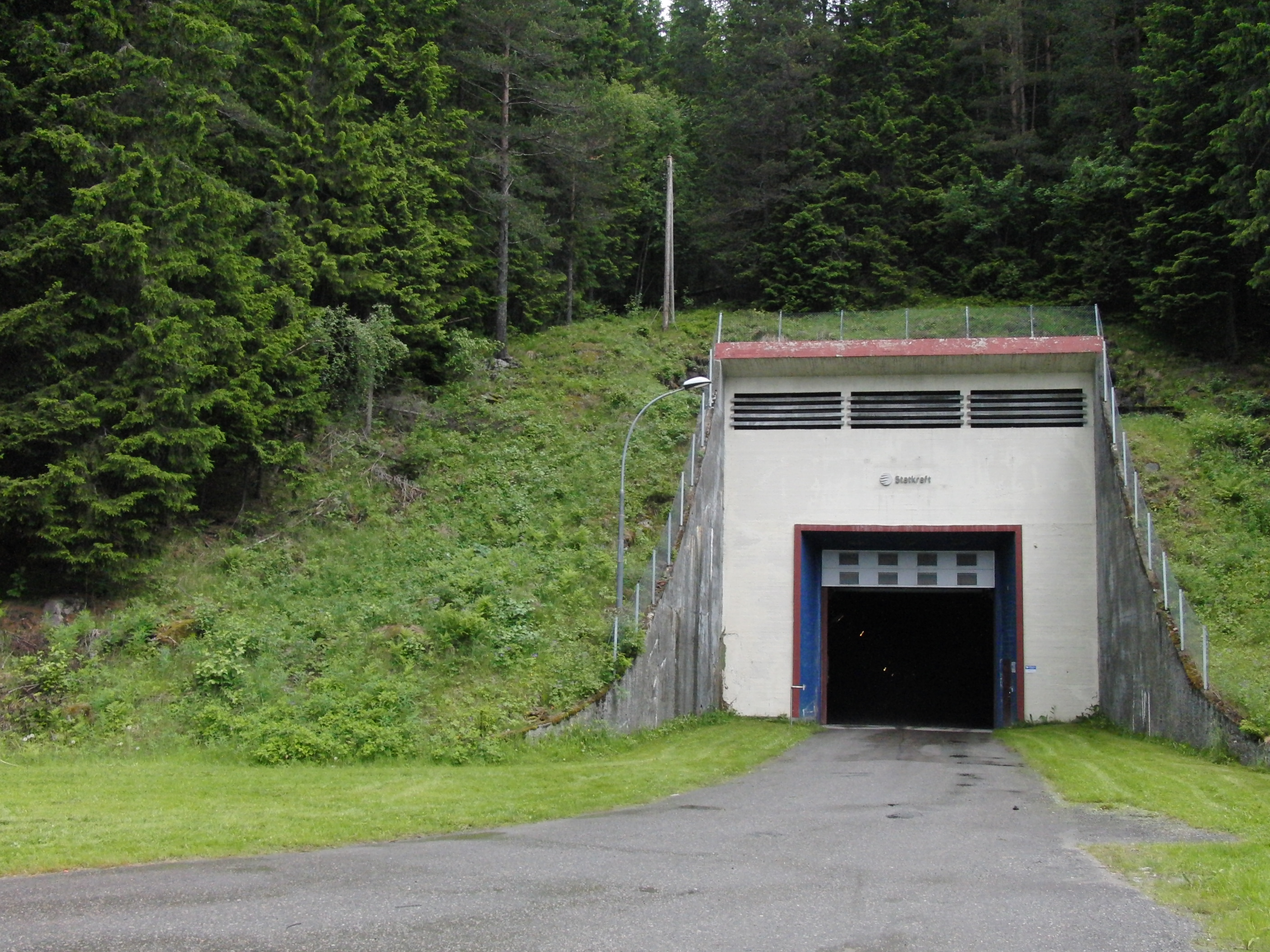
- Vinje kraftverk

- Location within Norway
- Official name: Vinje kraftverk
- Country: Norway
- Location: Vinje Municipality, Telemark
- Coordinates: 59°37′00″N 7°51′24″E
- Purpose: Power
- Status: Operational

Vinje Hydroelectric Power Station
- Installed capacity: 300 MW
- Capacity factor: 38.2%
- Annual generation: 1,003 GWh

The Vinje Power Station (Vinje kraftverk) is a hydroelectric power station located near the lake Vinjevatn in Vinje Municipality in Telemark, Norway. It operates at an installed capacity of 300 megawatts (400,000 hp), with an average annual production of 1,003 gigawatt-hours (3,610 TJ).
