= Dalen, Telemark =

Village in Tokke Municipality, Norway

Dalen
- Village
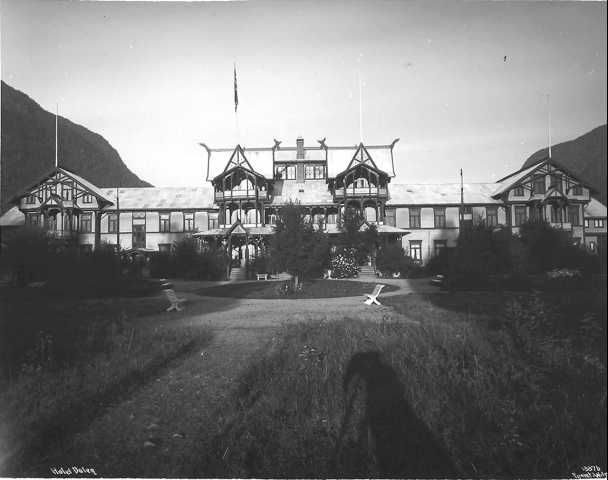
- View of the Dalen Hotel (opened in 1894)
- Interactive map of Dalen
- Coordinates: 59.44499°N 8.00492°E
- Country: Norway
- Region: Eastern Norway
- County: Telemark
- District: Vest-Telemark
- Municipality: Tokke Municipality

Area
  - Total: 0.76 km^{2} (0.29 sq mi)
- Elevation: 75 m (246 ft)

Population (2025)
  - Total: 572
  - Density: 753/km^{2} (1,950/sq mi)
- Time zone: UTC+01:00 (CET)
  - Summer (DST): UTC+02:00 (CEST)
- Post Code: 3880 Dalen

Dalen is the administrative centre of Tokke Municipality in Telemark county, Norway. The village is located at the flat river delta where the river Tokke flows into the west end of the lake Bandak. The village of Eidsborg lies about 3 kilometres (1.9 mi) north of Dalen and the village of Åmdals verk lies about 8 kilometres (5.0 mi) to the south of Dalen.

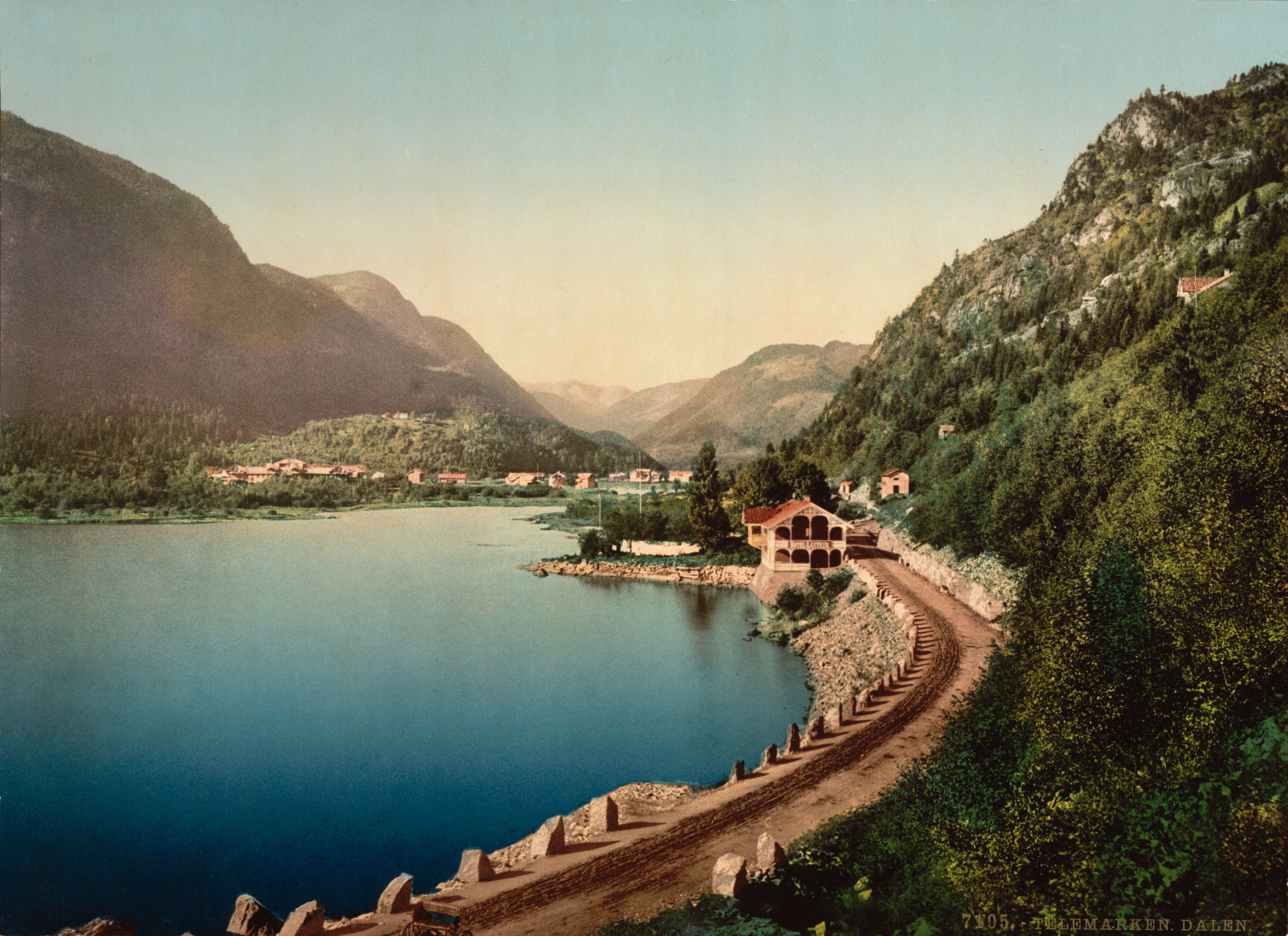
Dalen, Telemark, Norway, 1890s

The 0.76-square-kilometre (190-acre) village has a population (2025) of 572 and a population density of 753 inhabitants per square kilometre (1,950/sq mi).

The village of Dalen is the westernmost endpoint of the Telemark Canal which runs from Dalen to the town of Skien to the southeast. Dalen became a tourist site due to all the canal traffic. The Dalen Hotel, built in 1894, is among the largest wooden buildings in Norway.

The Tokke Hydroelectric Power Station is a hydroelectric power station that is located on the east side of Dalen. The power station exploits the change in height from the lake Vinjevatn to the lake Bandak at Dalen. Statkraft's regional headquarters for Eastern Norway are located in Dalen. This headquarters oversees and manages 38 power stations in the region. Dalen's population increased as the power systems were constructed during the 1950s, but then declined again after this finished by the 1960s.

== Name ==
The village is named Dalen. In Norwegian, the preposition used for locations can vary depending on the name. "In Dalen" is translated på Dalen—literally "on Dalen".
