= Kalhovdfjorden =

Lake in Telemark, Norway

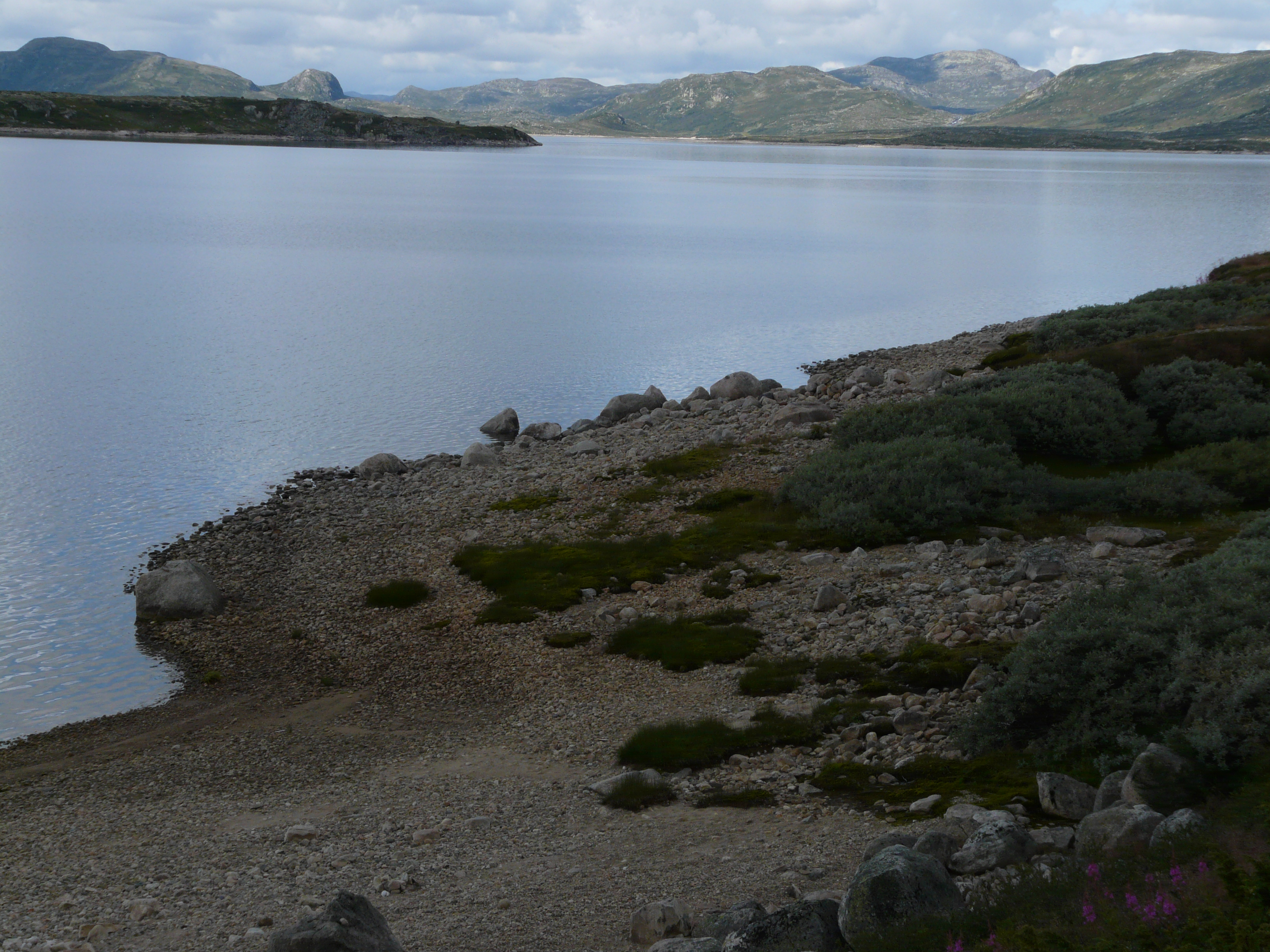
- View of the lake
- Interactive map of Kalhovdfjorden
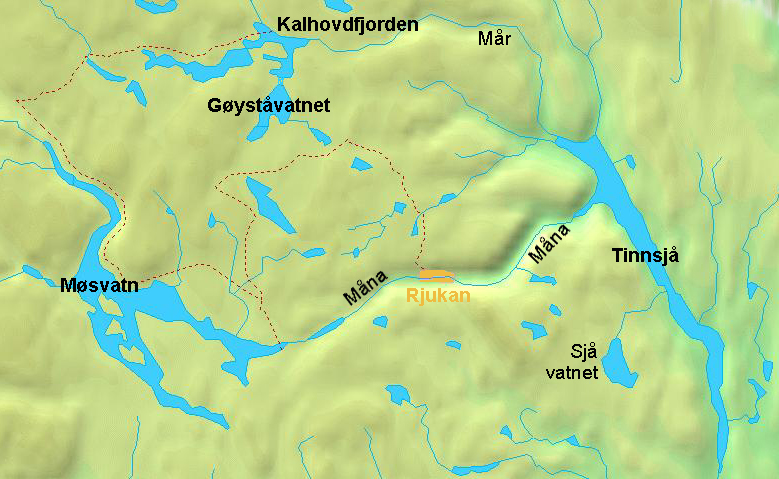
- Location of Kalhovdfjorden in the Skiensvassdraget area
- Location: Tinn Municipality, Telemark
- Coordinates: 60.06809°N 8.31289°E
- Primary outflows: Mår
- Catchment area: Skien watershed
- Basin countries: Norway
- Surface area: 20.39 km^{2} (7.87 sq mi)
- Shore length^{1}: 79 kilometres (49 mi)
- Surface elevation: 1,084 metres (3,556 ft)
- References: NVE
- ^{1} Shore length is not a well-defined measure.

Kalhovdfjorden is a lake in Tinn Municipality in Telemark county, Norway. The lake lies about 20 kilometres (12 mi) to the north of the town of Rjukan and about 15 kilometres (9.3 mi) east of the Hardangervidda National Park. The lake is part of the Skien watershed. The river Mår is the main outflow of the lake. The lake Møsvatn lies to the southwest and the lake Tinnsjå lies to the southeast. The area of the lake is 20.39 square kilometers (7.87 sq mi) and it is located 1,084 meters (3,556 ft) above sea level.

== See also ==
- List of lakes in Norway
