= Åmot, Vinje =

Village in Vinje Municipality, Norway

Åmot
- Village
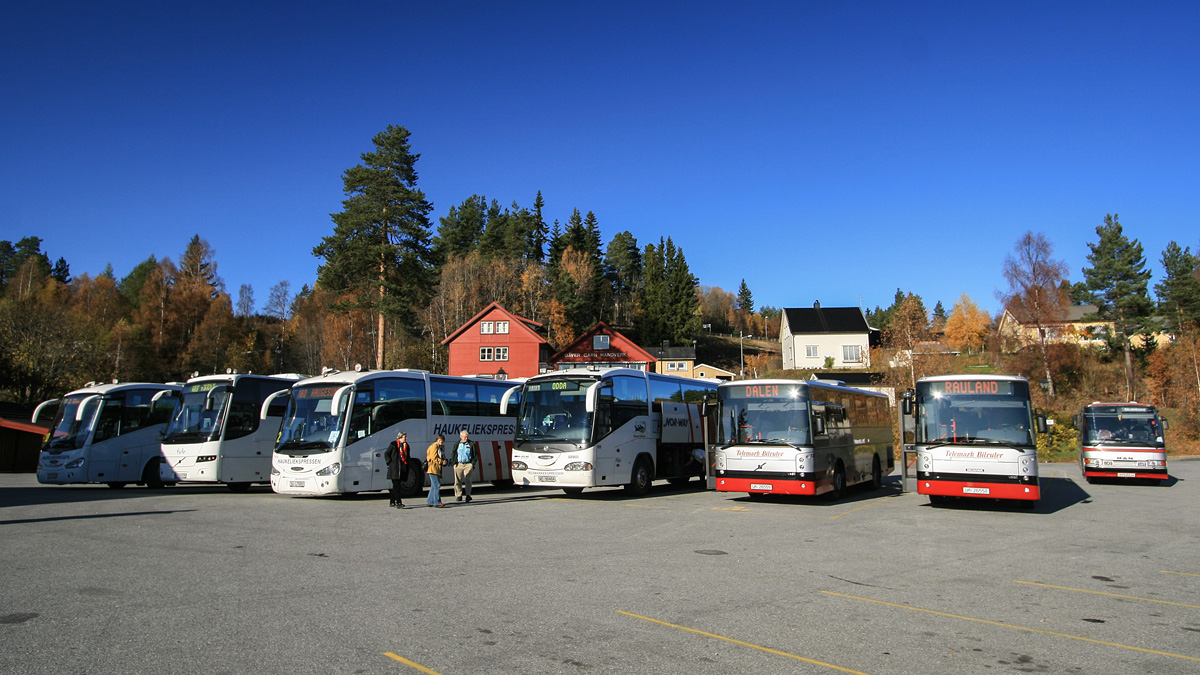
- View of the village bus station
- Interactive map of Åmot
- Coordinates: 59.56974°N 7.98871°E
- Country: Norway
- Region: Eastern Norway
- County: Telemark
- District: Vest-Telemark
- Municipality: Vinje Municipality

Area
  - Total: 1.12 km^{2} (0.43 sq mi)
- Elevation: 465 m (1,526 ft)

Population (2025)
  - Total: 711
  - Density: 635/km^{2} (1,640/sq mi)
- Time zone: UTC+01:00 (CET)
  - Summer (DST): UTC+02:00 (CEST)
- Post Code: 3890 Vinje

Åmot is the administrative centre of Vinje Municipality in Telemark county, Norway. The village is located at the confluence of the rivers Tokke and Vinjeåi. The village of Øyfjell lies about 10 kilometres (6.2 mi) to the east, the village of Dalen lies about 20 kilometres (12 mi) to the south, and the village of Edland lies about 30 kilometres (19 mi) to the northwest.

The European route E134 highway passes through the village. The village has some industry, primarily related to forestry.The 1.12-square-kilometre (280-acre) village has a population of 711 in 2025 and a population density of 635 inhabitants per square kilometre (1,640/sq mi).
