= Vinje Municipality =

Municipality in Telemark, Norway

Vinje Municipality Vinje kommune
- Municipality
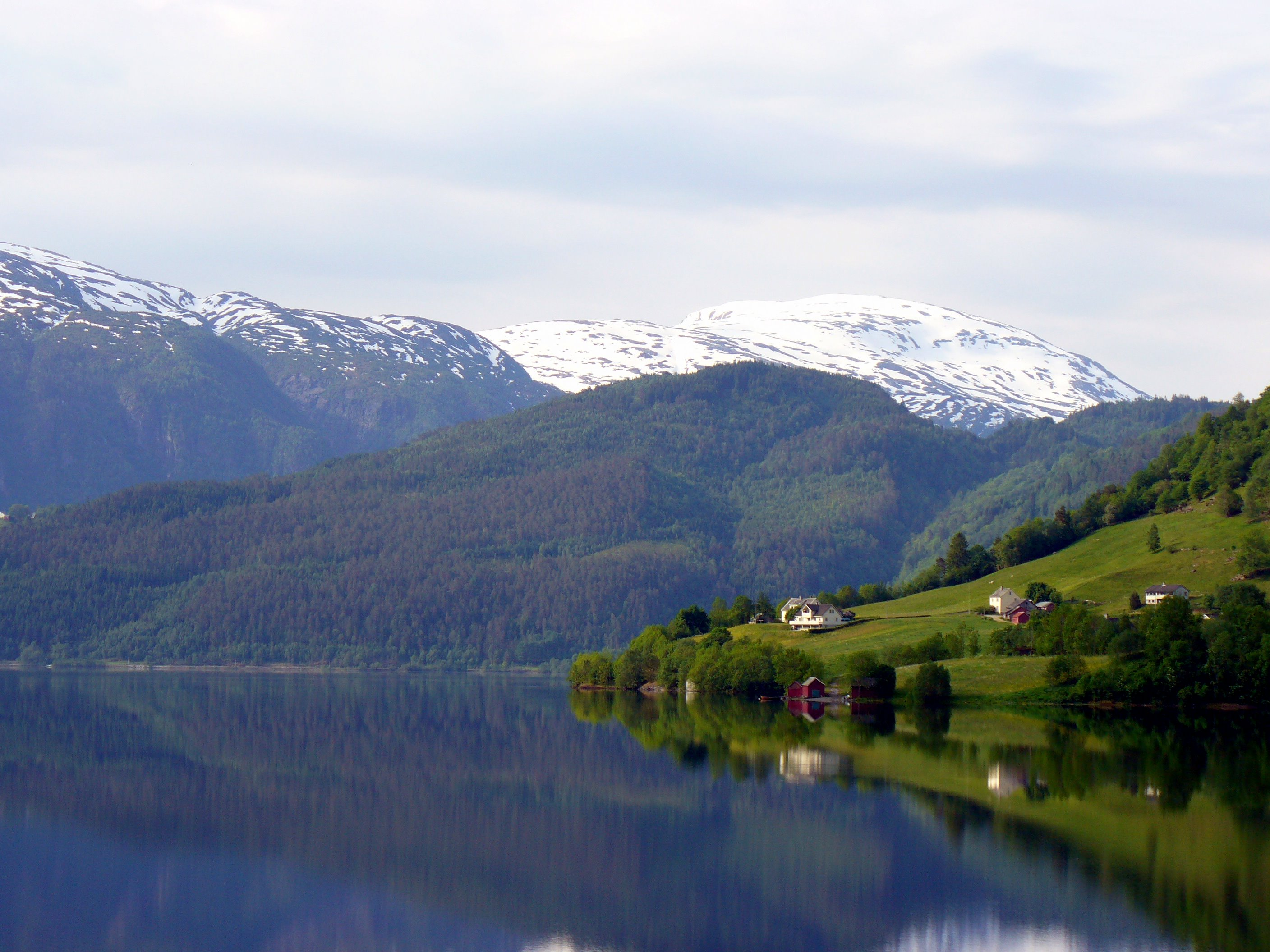

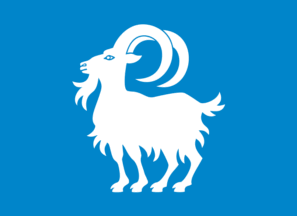
- Flag Coat of arms

- Telemark within Norway

- Vinje within Telemark
- Coordinates: 59°48′5″N 7°46′45″E
- Country: Norway
- County: Telemark
- District: Vest-Telemark
- Established: 1 Jan 1838
  - Created as: Formannskapsdistrikt
- Administrative centre: Åmot

Government
  - Mayor (2015): Jon Rikard Kleven (Sp)

Area
  - Total: 3,105.84 km^{2} (1,199.17 sq mi)
  - Land: 2,724.8 km^{2} (1,052.1 sq mi)
  - Water: 381.04 km^{2} (147.12 sq mi) 12.3%
  - Rank: #14 in Norway
- Highest elevation: 1,672.76 m (5,488.1 ft)

Population (2026)
  - Total: 3,829
  - Rank: #211 in Norway
  - Density: 1.4/km^{2} (3.6/sq mi)
  - Change (10 years): ▲ +2.7%
- Demonym(s): Vinbygg; Vinbygge (male); Vinbyggje (female)

Official language
  - Norwegian form: Nynorsk
- Time zone: UTC+01:00 (CET)
  - Summer (DST): UTC+02:00 (CEST)
- ISO 3166 code: NO-4036
- Website: Official website

Vinje (Norwegian pronunciation: [ˈvɪnjə]; locally [ˈveːnjə]) is a municipality in Telemark county, Norway. It is located in the traditional district of Vest-Telemark which is part of Øvre Telemark. The administrative centre of the municipality is the village of Åmot. Other villages in the municipality include Arabygdi, Edland, Grunge, Haukeli, Krysset, Møsstrond, Nesland, Øyfjell, Raulandsgrend, and Vinje.

The 3,105.84-square-kilometre (1,199.17 sq mi) municipality is the 14th largest by area out of the 357 municipalities in Norway. Vinje Municipality is the 211th most populous municipality in Norway with a population of 3,829. The municipality's population density is 1.4 inhabitants per square kilometre (3.6/sq mi) and its population has increased by 2.7% over the previous 10-year period.

== General information ==
=== Administrative history ===
The formannskapsdistrikt law of 1837 created a system of local government in Norway by establishing each town (ladested or kjøpstad) and each Church of Norway prestegjeld as a civil municipality. On 1 January 1838, Vinje prestegjeld was established as Vinje Municipality. In 1860, the northern district of Vinje Municipality (population: 745) was removed from the municipality and merged with the Øyfjell area of Laardal Municipality (population: 243) to form the new Rauland Municipality.

During the 1960s, there were many municipal mergers across Norway due to the work of the Schei Committee. On 1 January 1964, Rauland Municipality (population: 1,656) was dissolved and merged with Vinje Municipality (population: 2,565) to form an enlarged Vinje Municipality.

In 2020, there were many municipal and county mergers across Norway due to the work of the Solberg cabinet. Historically, this municipality was part of Telemark county. On 1 January 2020, the municipality became a part of the newly-formed Vestfold og Telemark county (after Telemark and Vestfold counties were merged). The merger was shortlived, and on 1 January 2024, the merger was undone and this municipality became part of Telemark county once again.

=== Name ===
The municipality is named after the old Vinje prestegjeld. The prestegjeld was named after the old Vinje farm (Old Norse: Vinjar) since the first Vinje Church was built there. The name is the plural form of the word vin which means "meadow" or "pasture".

=== Coat of arms ===
The coat of arms was granted on 16 November 1990. The official blazon is "Azure a billy goat argent" (Norwegian: På blå grunn ein sølv geitebukk). This means the arms have a blue field (background) and the charge is a billy goat. The billy goat has a tincture of argent which means it is commonly colored white, but if it is made out of metal, then silver is used. The color blue and the goat were chosen based on an old poem written by Aasmund Olavsson Vinje. The poem is called Blåmann (lit. 'blue man') which is about a goat named Blåmann. This was also chosen to represent the importance of sheep and goat farming in the mountainous municipality. The arms were designed by Arvid Sveen. The municipal flag has the same design as the coat of arms.

=== Churches ===
The Church of Norway has four parishes (sokn) within Vinje Municipality. It is part of the Øvre Telemark prosti (deanery) in the Diocese of Agder og Telemark.

Churches in Vinje Municipality
Parish (sokn)	Church name	Location of the church	Year built
Grungedal	Grunge Church	Grunge	1850
Rauland	Møsstrond Church	Møsstrond	1923
Rauland	Rauland Church	Raulandsgrend	1803
Vinje og Nesland	Nesland Church	Nesland	1847
Vinje og Nesland	Vinje Church	Vinje	1796
Øyfjell	Øyfjell Church	Øyfjell	1833

== History ==
The longstanding local traditions of arts and crafts have been well maintained. Rauland hosts a national academy for arts, crafts, and traditional music. Folk music has always been strong in Vinje. The Myllarguten, Targjei Augundsson lived the last years of his life in Rauland. Vinje has also been home to many rosemåling artists.

Vinje became a site of heavy battles during World War II, at the Battle of Vinjesvingen when Norwegian forces held out for over a month against superior German forces.

== Geography ==
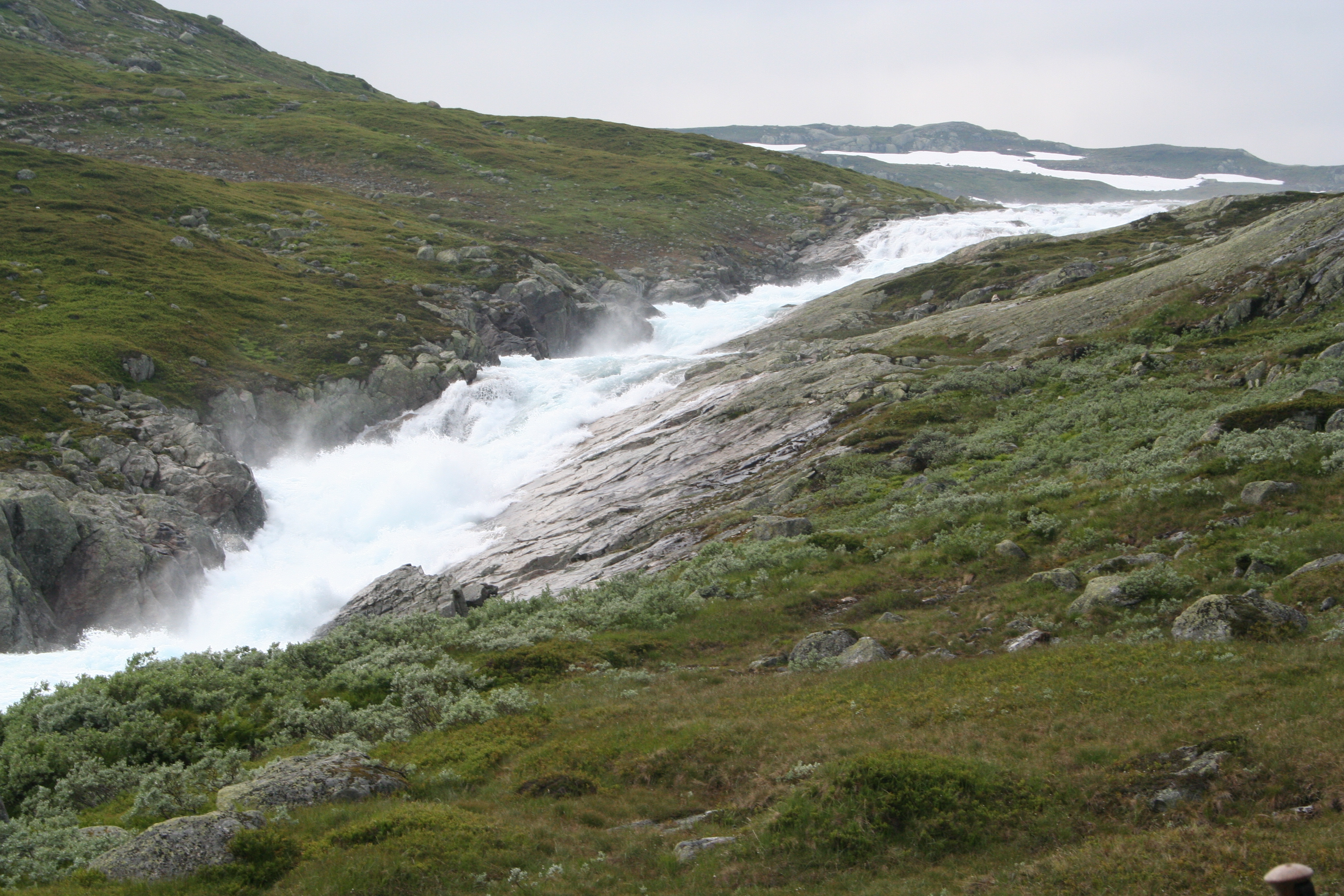
Bora river

Vinje Municipality is situated on both the Hardangervidda plateau and parts of the Setesdalsheiene mountain plateau. Most of the land area of the municipality is quite high in elevation. The highest point in the municipality is the 1,672.76-metre (5,488.1 ft) tall mountain Nupsegga, located on the county border with Ullensvang Municipality in Vestland county.

The European route E134 highway passes through the municipality on its way over the mountain pass to connect Eastern Norway and Western Norway. Vinje Municipality sits along the highway about halfway between Oslo (in the east) and Haugesund (on Norway's west coast). Starting at Haukeli, the Norwegian National Road 9 leads up the steep slopes to Hovden and further south down the Setesdal valley to the southern coastal city of Kristiansand.

The mountain ski resort Haukelifjell is also found nearby. The isolated and sparsely populated area is known for its rugged, mountainous terrain that supports a wide variety of outdoor activities, amongst them hiking, mountain biking, snowboarding, skiing, fishing, and canoeing. The Hardangervidda National Park lies partially in western Vinje. The village of Arabygdi lies on the lake Totak in the western part of Rauland. Its famous attraction is the "Urdbøuri", the largest stone scree in Northern Europe, with huge boulders scattered on the floor of the valley.

The rivers Tokke and Vinjeåi both flow through the municipality. The lakes Holmavatnet, Møsvatn, Songavatnet, Totak, and Vinjevatn are all located in Vinje Municipality as well. The mountains Fitjanuten, Kistenuten, and Vassdalseggi all lie on the municipal and county border in the western part of Vinje.

Nore og Uvdal Municipality (in Buskerud county) is located to the north, Tinn Municipality is located to the east, Seljord Municipality is located to the southeast, Tokke Municipality is located to the south, Bykle Municipality (in Agder county) is located to the southwest, Valle Municipality (in Agder county) is located to the west, and Ullensvang Municipality (in Vestland county) is located to the northwest.

=== Climate ===
Climate data for Vågsli 1991–2020 (821 m, avg high/low 2003-2025)
Month	Jan	Feb	Mar	Apr	May	Jun	Jul	Aug	Sep	Oct	Nov	Dec	Year
Mean daily maximum °C (°F)	−2.8 (27.0)	−1.3 (29.7)	1.6 (34.9)	5.3 (41.5)	9.8 (49.6)	14.7 (58.5)	17.2 (63.0)	15.5 (59.9)	11.9 (53.4)	6.1 (43.0)	1.3 (34.3)	−1.8 (28.8)	6.5 (43.6)
Daily mean °C (°F)	−6.1 (21.0)	−6.3 (20.7)	−4 (25)	0.1 (32.2)	4.4 (39.9)	8.8 (47.8)	11.8 (53.2)	10.7 (51.3)	7.1 (44.8)	1.6 (34.9)	−2 (28)	−5.7 (21.7)	1.7 (35.0)
Mean daily minimum °C (°F)	−10.9 (12.4)	−10.7 (12.7)	−8.2 (17.2)	−4.5 (23.9)	0 (32)	4.1 (39.4)	6.9 (44.4)	6.2 (43.2)	3.7 (38.7)	−0.8 (30.6)	−5.2 (22.6)	−9.6 (14.7)	−2.4 (27.7)
Average precipitation mm (inches)	156 (6.1)	109 (4.3)	91 (3.6)	56 (2.2)	54 (2.1)	64 (2.5)	76 (3.0)	94 (3.7)	95 (3.7)	124 (4.9)	120 (4.7)	136 (5.4)	1,175 (46.2)
Source 1: yr.no
Source 2: Seklima (avg highs/lows)

Climate data for Møsstrand II 1991-2020 (977 m, extremes 1980-)
Month	Jan	Feb	Mar	Apr	May	Jun	Jul	Aug	Sep	Oct	Nov	Dec	Year
Record high °C (°F)	9.3 (48.7)	9.0 (48.2)	13.0 (55.4)	15.6 (60.1)	24.1 (75.4)	27.4 (81.3)	29.0 (84.2)	25.6 (78.1)	21.9 (71.4)	21.0 (69.8)	11.7 (53.1)	7.6 (45.7)	29.0 (84.2)
Mean daily maximum °C (°F)	−3.4 (25.9)	−2.9 (26.8)	−0.1 (31.8)	4.1 (39.4)	9.3 (48.7)	14.3 (57.7)	16.6 (61.9)	15.1 (59.2)	10.6 (51.1)	4.9 (40.8)	0 (32)	−2.7 (27.1)	5.5 (41.9)
Daily mean °C (°F)	−6.4 (20.5)	−6.7 (19.9)	−4.5 (23.9)	−0.4 (31.3)	4.3 (39.7)	8.9 (48.0)	11.2 (52.2)	10.2 (50.4)	6.5 (43.7)	1.7 (35.1)	−2.5 (27.5)	−5.4 (22.3)	1.4 (34.5)
Mean daily minimum °C (°F)	−9.2 (15.4)	−9.7 (14.5)	−7.9 (17.8)	−4 (25)	0.4 (32.7)	4.6 (40.3)	7.4 (45.3)	6.9 (44.4)	3.9 (39.0)	−0.5 (31.1)	−4.8 (23.4)	−8.3 (17.1)	−1.8 (28.8)
Record low °C (°F)	−31.8 (−25.2)	−30.2 (−22.4)	−25.1 (−13.2)	−20.5 (−4.9)	−12.2 (10.0)	−3.3 (26.1)	−1.3 (29.7)	−0.1 (31.8)	−5.6 (21.9)	−14.4 (6.1)	−21.0 (−5.8)	−25.6 (−14.1)	−31.8 (−25.2)
Average precipitation mm (inches)	77.7 (3.06)	56 (2.2)	48.1 (1.89)	40.2 (1.58)	53.1 (2.09)	68.7 (2.70)	90.2 (3.55)	91.1 (3.59)	80.6 (3.17)	82.7 (3.26)	74 (2.9)	65.6 (2.58)	828 (32.57)
Source 1: yr.no/Norwegian Meteorological Institute
Source 2: NOAA

== Government ==
Vinje Municipality is responsible for primary education (through 10th grade), outpatient health services, senior citizen services, welfare and other social services, zoning, economic development, and municipal roads and utilities. The municipality is governed by a municipal council of directly elected representatives. The mayor is indirectly elected by a vote of the municipal council. The municipality is under the jurisdiction of the Øvre Telemark District Court and the Agder Court of Appeal.

=== Municipal council ===
The municipal council (Kommunestyre) of Vinje Municipality is made up of 25 representatives that are elected to four-year terms. The tables below show the current and historical composition of the council by political party.

Vinje kommunestyre 2023–2027
Party name (in Nynorsk)	Number of representatives
Labour Party (Arbeidarpartiet)	3
Progress Party (Framstegspartiet)	1
Conservative Party (Høgre)	1
Industry and Business Party (Industri‑ og Næringspartiet)	4
Centre Party (Senterpartiet)	8
Socialist Left Party (Sosialistisk Venstreparti)	4
Vinje cross-party local list (Vinje tverrpolitiske bygdeliste)	4
Total number of members:	25

Vinje kommunestyre 2019–2023
Party name (in Nynorsk)	Number of representatives
Labour Party (Arbeidarpartiet)	4
Progress Party (Framstegspartiet)	1
Conservative Party (Høgre)	2
Christian Democratic Party (Kristeleg Folkeparti)	1
Centre Party (Senterpartiet)	14
Socialist Left Party (Sosialistisk Venstreparti)	3
Total number of members:	25

Vinje kommunestyre 2015–2019
Party name (in Nynorsk)	Number of representatives
Labour Party (Arbeidarpartiet)	7
Progress Party (Framstegspartiet)	1
Conservative Party (Høgre)	3
Centre Party (Senterpartiet)	10
Socialist Left Party (Sosialistisk Venstreparti)	3
Liberal Party (Venstre)	1
Total number of members:	25

Vinje kommunestyre 2011–2015
Party name (in Nynorsk)	Number of representatives
Labour Party (Arbeidarpartiet)	7
Progress Party (Framstegspartiet)	2
Conservative Party (Høgre)	3
Christian Democratic Party (Kristeleg Folkeparti)	1
Centre Party (Senterpartiet)	5
Socialist Left Party (Sosialistisk Venstreparti)	6
Liberal Party (Venstre)	1
Total number of members:	25

Vinje kommunestyre 2007–2011
Party name (in Nynorsk)	Number of representatives
Labour Party (Arbeidarpartiet)	7
Progress Party (Framstegspartiet)	3
Conservative Party (Høgre)	1
Christian Democratic Party (Kristeleg Folkeparti)	2
Centre Party (Senterpartiet)	5
Socialist Left Party (Sosialistisk Venstreparti)	7
Total number of members:	25

Vinje kommunestyre 2003–2007
Party name (in Nynorsk)	Number of representatives
Labour Party (Arbeidarpartiet)	7
Progress Party (Framstegspartiet)	3
Conservative Party (Høgre)	2
Christian Democratic Party (Kristeleg Folkeparti)	1
Centre Party (Senterpartiet)	4
Socialist Left Party (Sosialistisk Venstreparti)	6
Local list 2003 (Bygdelista 2003)	2
Total number of members:	25

Vinje kommunestyre 1999–2003
Party name (in Nynorsk)	Number of representatives
Labour Party (Arbeidarpartiet)	11
Conservative Party (Høgre)	2
Christian Democratic Party (Kristeleg Folkeparti)	4
Centre Party (Senterpartiet)	6
Socialist Left Party (Sosialistisk Venstreparti)	4
Local list for Vinje (Bygdelista for Vinje)	1
Rauland list (Raulandslista)	1
Total number of members:	29

Vinje kommunestyre 1995–1999
Party name (in Nynorsk)	Number of representatives
Labour Party (Arbeidarpartiet)	9
Conservative Party (Høgre)	1
Christian Democratic Party (Kristeleg Folkeparti)	3
Centre Party (Senterpartiet)	9
Socialist Left Party (Sosialistisk Venstreparti)	4
Liberal Party (Venstre)	1
Local list for independent voters (Bygdelista for uavhengige velgere)	2
Total number of members:	29

Vinje kommunestyre 1991–1995
Party name (in Nynorsk)	Number of representatives
Labour Party (Arbeidarpartiet)	9
Conservative Party (Høgre)	2
Christian Democratic Party (Kristeleg Folkeparti)	2
Centre Party (Senterpartiet)	9
Socialist Left Party (Sosialistisk Venstreparti)	6
Liberal Party (Venstre)	1
Total number of members:	29

Vinje kommunestyre 1987–1991
Party name (in Nynorsk)	Number of representatives
Labour Party (Arbeidarpartiet)	14
Conservative Party (Høgre)	4
Christian Democratic Party (Kristeleg Folkeparti)	2
Centre Party (Senterpartiet)	5
Socialist Left Party (Sosialistisk Venstreparti)	3
Liberal Party (Venstre)	1
Total number of members:	29

Vinje kommunestyre 1983–1987
Party name (in Nynorsk)	Number of representatives
Labour Party (Arbeidarpartiet)	14
Conservative Party (Høgre)	5
Christian Democratic Party (Kristeleg Folkeparti)	2
Centre Party (Senterpartiet)	5
Socialist Left Party (Sosialistisk Venstreparti)	2
Liberal Party (Venstre)	1
Total number of members:	29

Vinje kommunestyre 1979–1983
Party name (in Nynorsk)	Number of representatives
Labour Party (Arbeidarpartiet)	12
Conservative Party (Høgre)	3
Christian Democratic Party (Kristeleg Folkeparti)	3
Centre Party (Senterpartiet)	8
Socialist Left Party (Sosialistisk Venstreparti)	1
Liberal Party (Venstre)	1
Socialist unity (Sosialistisk einskap)	1
Total number of members:	29

Vinje kommunestyre 1975–1979
Party name (in Nynorsk)	Number of representatives
Labour Party (Arbeidarpartiet)	12
Christian Democratic Party (Kristeleg Folkeparti)	4
Centre Party (Senterpartiet)	9
Socialist Left Party (Sosialistisk Venstreparti)	2
Politically Unbound (Partipolitisk Ubundne)	2
Total number of members:	29

Vinje kommunestyre 1971–1975
Party name (in Nynorsk)	Number of representatives
Labour Party (Arbeidarpartiet)	14
Christian Democratic Party (Kristeleg Folkeparti)	3
Centre Party (Senterpartiet)	7
Socialist People's Party (Sosialistisk Folkeparti)	1
Liberal Party (Venstre)	1
Local List(s) (Lokale lister)	3
Total number of members:	29

Vinje kommunestyre 1967–1971
Party name (in Nynorsk)	Number of representatives
Labour Party (Arbeidarpartiet)	16
Christian Democratic Party (Kristeleg Folkeparti)	3
Socialist People's Party (Sosialistisk Folkeparti)	1
Joint List(s) of Non-Socialist Parties (Borgarlege Felleslister)	9
Total number of members:	29

Vinje kommunestyre 1963–1967
Party name (in Nynorsk)	Number of representatives
Labour Party (Arbeidarpartiet)	18
Christian Democratic Party (Kristeleg Folkeparti)	3
Centre Party (Senterpartiet)	5
Socialist People's Party (Sosialistisk Folkeparti)	2
Liberal Party (Venstre)	5
Total number of members:	33

Vinje heradsstyre 1959–1963
Party name (in Nynorsk)	Number of representatives
Labour Party (Arbeidarpartiet)	11
Centre Party (Senterpartiet)	6
Liberal Party (Venstre)	4
Total number of members:	21

Vinje heradsstyre 1955–1959
Party name (in Nynorsk)	Number of representatives
Labour Party (Arbeidarpartiet)	10
Joint List(s) of Non-Socialist Parties (Borgarlege Felleslister)	11
Total number of members:	21

Vinje heradsstyre 1951–1955
Party name (in Nynorsk)	Number of representatives
Labour Party (Arbeidarpartiet)	10
Christian Democratic Party (Kristeleg Folkeparti)	2
Joint List(s) of Non-Socialist Parties (Borgarlege Felleslister)	12
Total number of members:	24

Vinje heradsstyre 1947–1951
Party name (in Nynorsk)	Number of representatives
Labour Party (Arbeidarpartiet)	8
Communist Party (Kommunistiske Parti)	1
Christian Democratic Party (Kristeleg Folkeparti)	1
Joint list of the Liberal Party (Venstre) and the Radical People's Party (Radikale Folkepartiet)	6
Joint List(s) of Non-Socialist Parties (Borgarlege Felleslister)	8
Total number of members:	24

Vinje heradsstyre 1945–1947
Party name (in Nynorsk)	Number of representatives
Labour Party (Arbeidarpartiet)	5
Communist Party (Kommunistiske Parti)	2
List of workers, fishermen, and small farmholders (Arbeidarar, fiskarar, småbrukarar liste)	2
Joint List(s) of Non-Socialist Parties (Borgarlege Felleslister)	7
Local List(s) (Lokale lister)	8
Total number of members:	24

Vinje heradsstyre 1937–1941*
Party name (in Nynorsk)	Number of representatives
Labour Party (Arbeidarpartiet)	11
Liberal Party (Venstre)	5
Joint List(s) of Non-Socialist Parties (Borgarlege Felleslister)	8
Total number of members:	24
Note: Due to the German occupation of Norway during World War II, no elections were held for new municipal councils until after the war ended in 1945.

=== Mayor ===
The mayor (Nynorsk: ordførar) of Vinje Municipality is the political leader of the municipality and the chairperson of the municipal council. The following people have held this position:

- 1838–1840: Rev. Frid2 Ingier
- 1840–1841: Tallef Vinje
- 1841–1852: Richard A. Berge
- 1855–1859: Aslak T. Vinje
- 1859–1861: Nils Pedersen Brekke
- 1861–1863: Olav T. Nestestog
- 1863–1865: Aslak Tovsen Vinje
- 1865–1869: Aslak Tallefsen Vinje
- 1869–1872: A.O. Jamsgard
- 1872–1873: Olav Fetveit
- 1873–1880: Sv. Bjørnsen Lofthus
- 1880–1891: Olav T. Nestestog
- 1891–1893: Tarjei Vesaas
- 1893–1895: Bjørn Lofthus
- 1895–1898: Johans Hylland
- 1898–1899: Aanund Nestestog
- 1899–1904: Olav A. Hustveit
- 1905–1908: Johans Hylland
- 1909–1910: Styrkår S. Særen
- 1911–1913: Johans Hylland
- 1914–1919: Bjørn Fetveit
- 1920–1928: O.K. Bakken
- 1929–1931: Knut Nordstoga
- 1931–1932: Aasmund Høgetveit
- 1932–1934: O.K. Bakken
- 1935–1937: Harald O. Vågslid
- 1938–1940: O.K. Bakken
- 1941–1941: Torgeir Tjønn (NS)
- 1941–1942: Halvor Berdal (NS)
- 1943–1943: T. Gårder (NS)
- 1943–1944: Einar Vaagen (NS)
- 1945–1945: O.K. Bakken
- 1946–1947: B. Indrelid (V)
- 1947–1948: Leiv Fetveit (LL)
- 1948–1951: Knut T. Vågslid (LL)
- 1951–1955: B. Indrelid (V)
- 1955–1959: Knut Tveito (LL)
- 1960–1971: Aslak Versto (Ap)
- 1976–1979: Ingvald Godal (Sp)
- 1980–1987: Aslak Versto (Ap)
- 1988–1995: Olav Nystog (Ap)
- 1995–1999: Olav Nordstoga (Sp)
- 1999–2003: Børre Rønningen (Ap)
- 2003–2015: Arne Vinje (SV)
- 2015–present: Jon Rikard Kleven (Sp)

== Notable people ==
=== The Arts ===
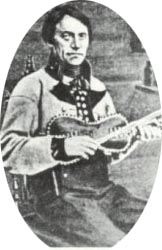
Myllarguten

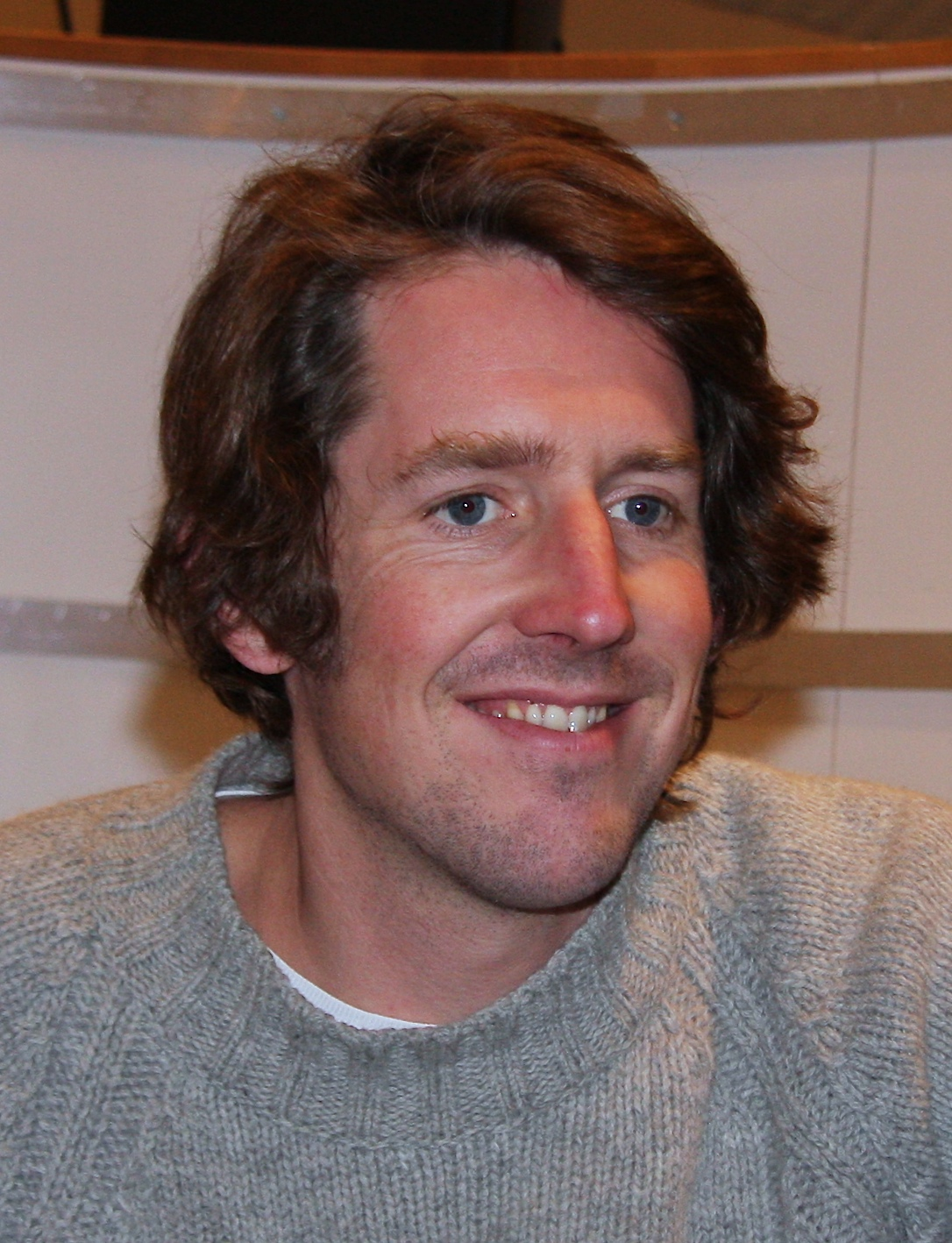
Odd Nordstoga

- Sveinung Svalastoga (1772 in Rauland – 1809), a rosemåling painter, poet, and woodcarver
- Myllarguten (Torgeir Agundson Øygarden) (1801–1872), a folk musician and master fiddler
- Aasmund Olavsson Vinje (1818–1870), a poet and journalist who used Nynorsk
- Rikard Berge (1881 in Rauland – 1969), a folklorist, museologist, biographer, and editor
- Tarjei Vesaas (1897–1970), a poet and novelist
- Aslaug Vaa (1889 in Rauland – 1965), a poet and playwright
- Aslak Brekke (1901–1978), a vocalist using stev and a folk singer
- Dyre Vaa (1903–1980), a sculptor and painter whose works are found in Oslo and Vinje
- Anne Lofthus (1932–2003), a ceramic artist and art teacher
- Guri Vesaas (born 1939), a writer and translator of children's books
- Stein Versto (born 1957), a poet, novelist, translator, and folk musician
- Aasmund Nordstoga (born 1964), a musician, singer, composer, and TV presenter
- Sven Erik Kristiansen (born 1969), a musician and former vocalist in the black metal band Mayhem
- Arve Moen Bergset (born 1972), a traditional folk singer, hardanger fiddler, and classical violinist
- Odd Nordstoga (born 1972), a folk singer, musician, actor and editor
- Ingebjørg Bratland (born 1990), a folk singer, kveder, and artist

=== Public Service ===
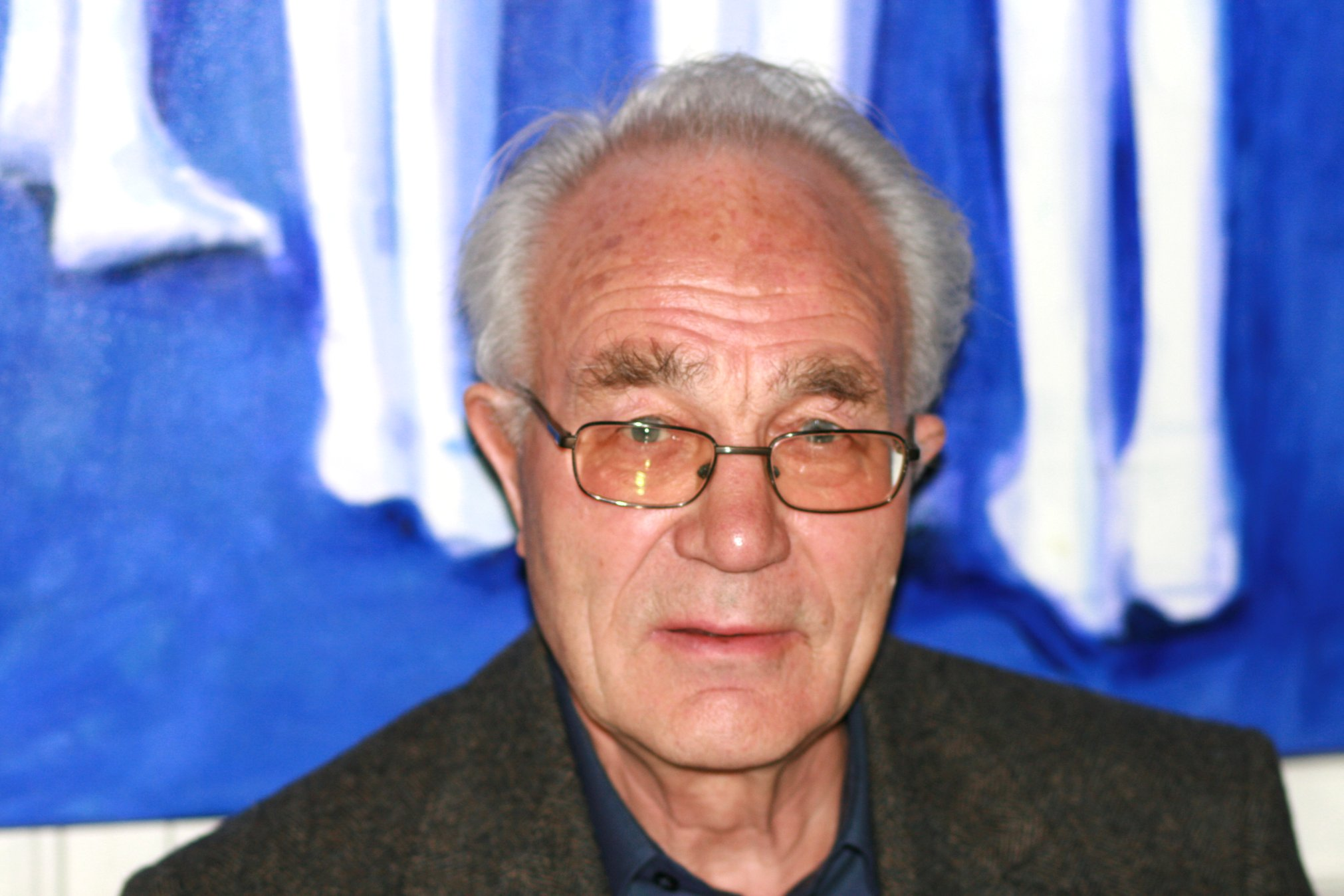
Olav Vesaas, 2007

- Paul Peterson Paus (1625-1682), a cleric, political activist, and poet
- Olav Aslakson Versto (1892 in Rauland – 1977), a politician
- Einar Skinnarland (1918–2002), a Norwegian resistance fighter during WWII and dam builder
- Aslak Versto (1924-1992), a politician
- Olav Vesaas (born 1935), a journalist, biographer, and publisher
- Olav Versto (1950–2011), a journalist and editor
- Astrid Versto (born 1953), a journalist and diplomat

=== Sport ===
- Olav Jenssen (born 1962), a discus thrower who competed in the 1992 Summer Olympics
- Knut Tore Apeland (born 1968), a former Nordic combined skier and two-time team silver medallist at the 1992 & 1994 Winter Olympics
- Terje Håkonsen (born 1974), a snowboarder

== Attractions ==
- The home of Myllarguten is now a small museum. (The cotters place Kosi in Arabygdi.)
- The monument of Myllarguten, the 19th century musician, who played for kings and who inspired Edvard Grieg . It is located on the roadside vis-a-vis Kosi.
