= Edland =

Village in Vinje Municipality, Norway

- Village
- Interactive map of Edland
- Coordinates: 59.73808°N 7.6036°E
- Country: Norway
- Region: Eastern Norway
- County: Telemark
- District: Vest-Telemark
- Municipality: Vinje Municipality
- Elevation: 542 m (1,778 ft)
- Time zone: UTC+01:00 (CET)
  - Summer (DST): UTC+02:00 (CEST)
- Post Code: 3895 Edland

Edland is a village in Vinje Municipality in Telemark county, Norway. The village is located where the rivers Bora and Kjela meet, just to the east of the village of Haukeli. The European route E134 highway runs through the village. The village of Grunge is located about 8 kilometres (5.0 mi) to the southeast and the village of Arabygdi lies about 10 kilometres (6.2 mi) to the northeast. Aasmund Olavsson Vinje took the plot of his epic poem about "Storegut" from Edland.
