= Bandak =

Lake in Telemark, Norway

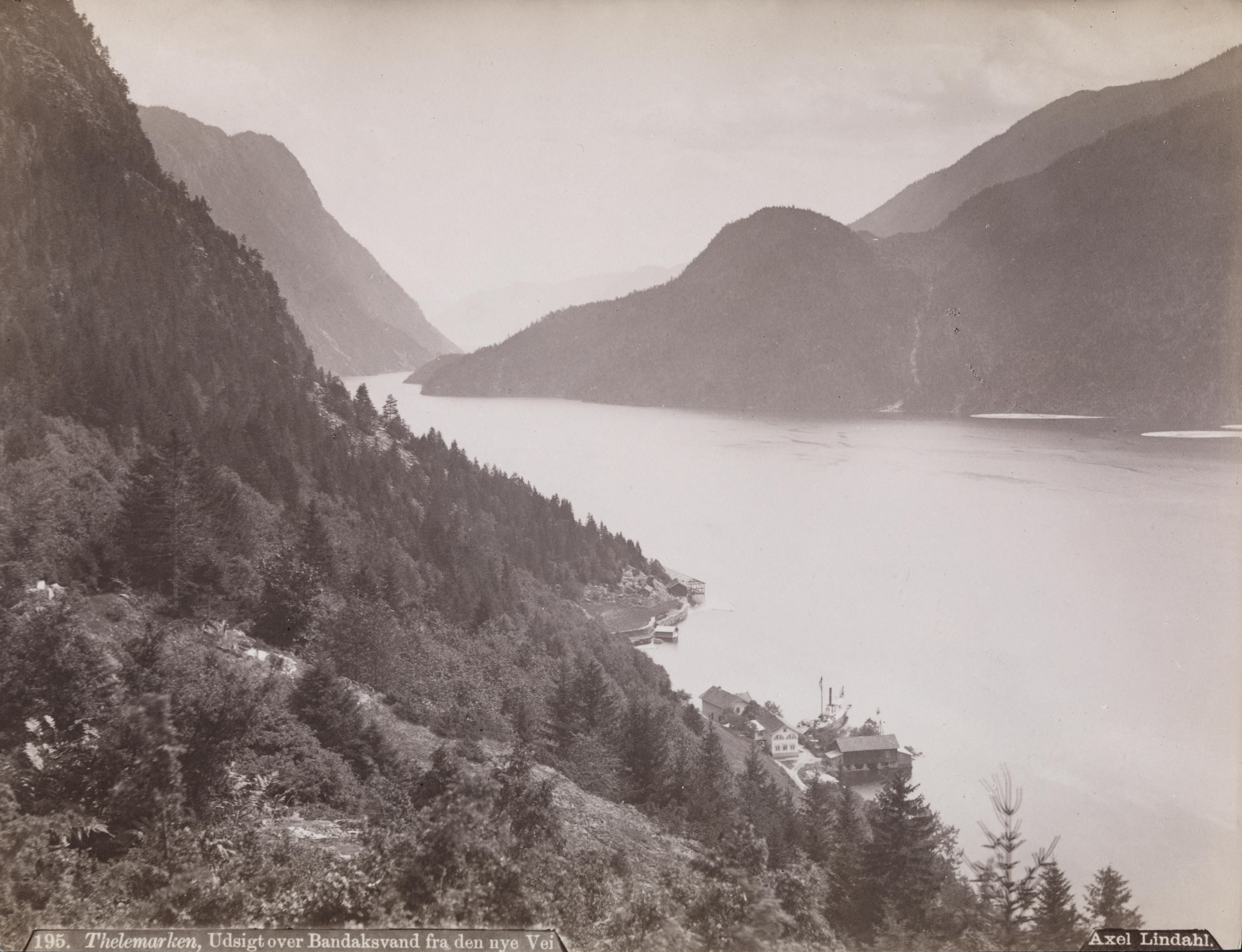
- Bandak lake about 1890; Credit: Axel Lindahl
- Interactive map of Bandak
- Location: Tokke and Kviteseid, Telemark
- Coordinates: 59.43865°N 8.03582°E
- Type: glacial lake
- Primary inflows: Lårdalsåi and Tokke
- Primary outflows: Strauman
- Catchment area: 2,545.7 km^{2} (982.9 sq mi)
- Basin countries: Norway
- Max. length: 27 km (17 mi)
- Max. width: 1.9 km (1.2 mi)
- Surface area: 26.77 km^{2} (10.34 sq mi)
- Average depth: 121 m (397 ft)
- Max. depth: 325 m (1,066 ft)
- Water volume: 3.24 km^{3} (0.78 cu mi)
- Shore length^{1}: 60.16 km (37.38 mi)
- Surface elevation: 72 m (236 ft)
- Islands: Bandaksøy
- References: NVE
- ^{1} Shore length is not a well-defined measure.

Bandak is a lake in Kviteseid Municipality and Tokke Municipality in Telemark county, Norway. The lake, which is part of the Telemark Canal route, belongs to the Skien watershed. The river Tokke flows into the lake, and the outlet is via the river Strauman, which flows to the lake Kviteseidvatnet.

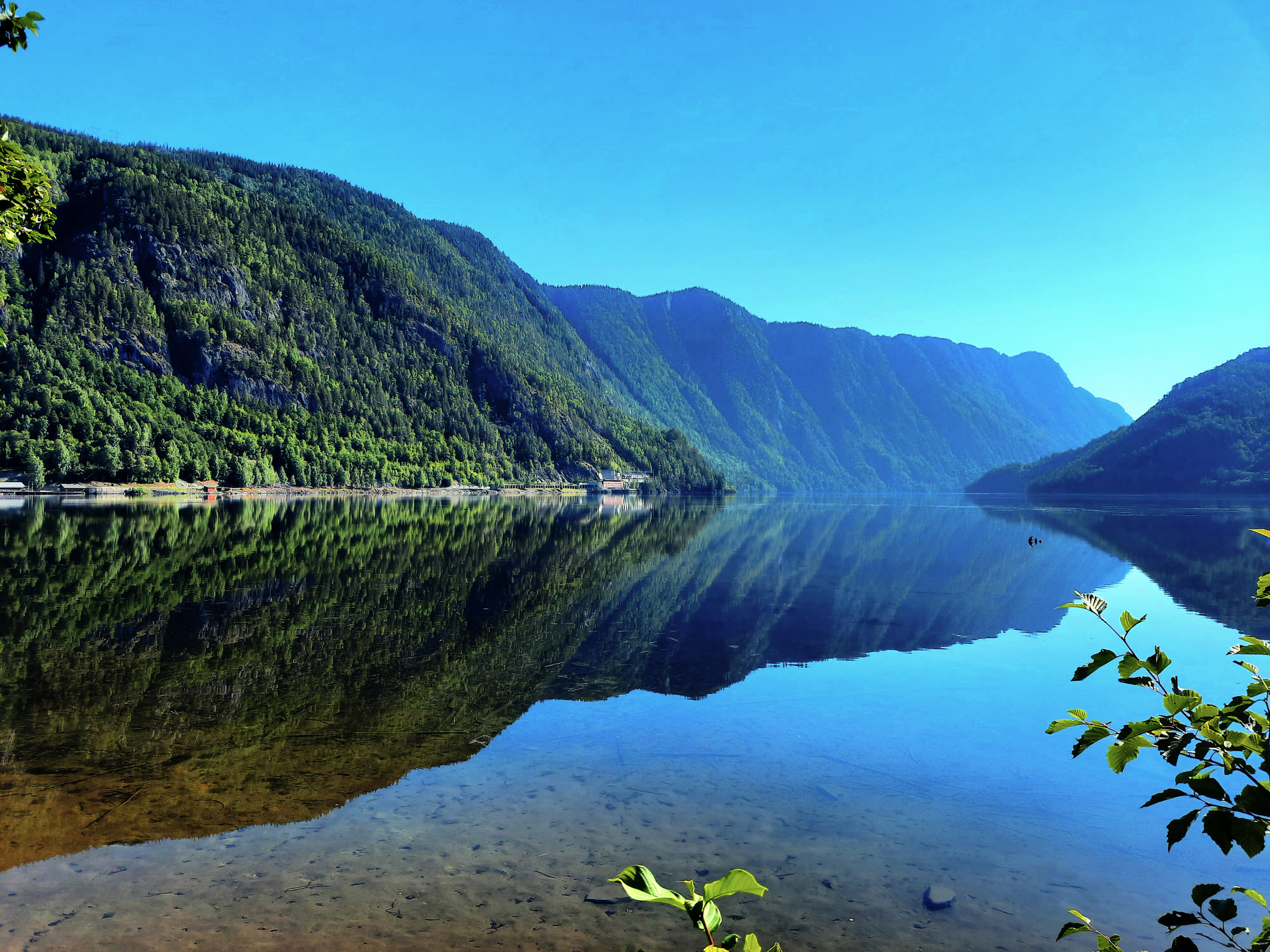
View of the lake

The lake has an area of 26.8 square kilometres (10.3 sq mi). The average depth of the lake is 121 m (397 ft) which is about 49 m (161 ft) below sea level. The deepest part of the lake reaches 325 metres (1,066 ft) which makes it the eighth deepest lake in Norway. The 27-kilometre (17 mi) long lake measures about 2 kilometres (1.2 mi) at the widest. The catchment area for the lake is about 2,545.7 square kilometres (982.9 sq mi).

The Tokke Hydroelectric Power Station utilizes the hydraulic head from the nearby lake Vinjevatn to Bandak of about 394 metres (1,293 ft) to generate electricity. It is one of northern Europe's largest power plants with a production of some 430 megawatts (580,000 hp). The plant produces an average annual production of 2,140 gigawatt-hours (7,700 TJ).

== See also ==
- List of lakes in Norway
