= Tokke Hydroelectric Power Station =

Hydroelectric power station in Norway

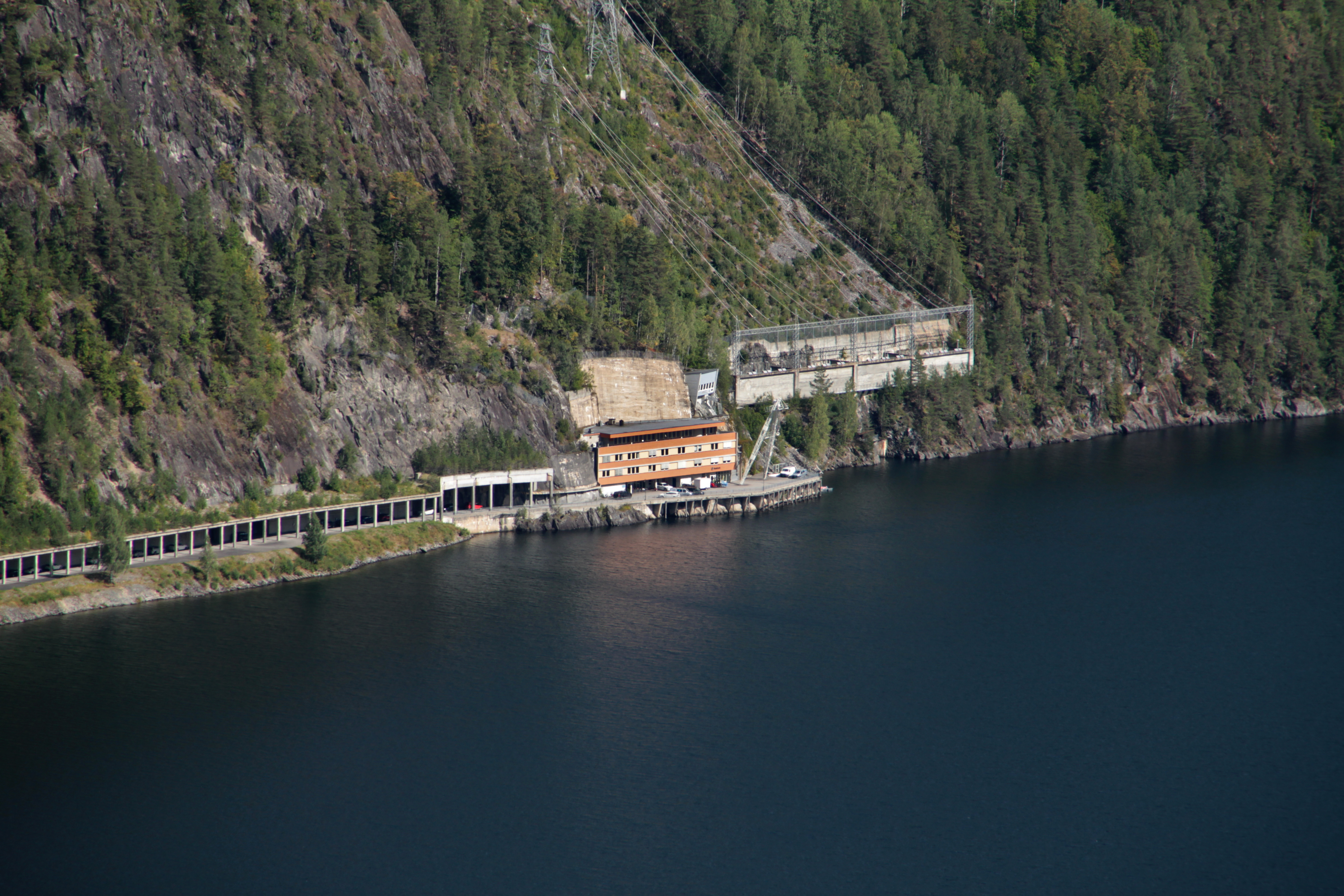
- Left the access road to Tokke Hydroelectric Power Station
- Interactive map of Tokke Hydroelectric Power Station
- Official name: Tokke kraftverk
- Country: Norway
- Location: Tokke Municipality
- Coordinates: 59°26′40″N 8°02′18″E
- Status: Operational
- Opening date: 1961; 65 years ago
- Owner: Statkraft

Upper reservoir
- Creates: Vinjevatn

Lower reservoir
- Creates: Bandak

Power Station
- Hydraulic head: 394 metres (1,293 ft)
- Turbines: 4
- Installed capacity: 430 MW
- Capacity factor: 56.9%
- Annual generation: 2,140 GW·h

The Tokke Power Station (Norwegian: Tokke kraftverk) is a hydroelectric power station located in Tokke Municipality in Telemark county, Norway. It is owned by Statkraft and it operates at an installed capacity of 430 megawatts (580,000 hp), with an average annual production of 2,140 gigawatt-hours (7,700 TJ). The power station exploits the height difference of 394 metres (1,293 ft) from the lake Vinjevatn to the lake Bandak.
