= Tokke (river) =

River in Telemark, Norway

Tokke Tokkeåi
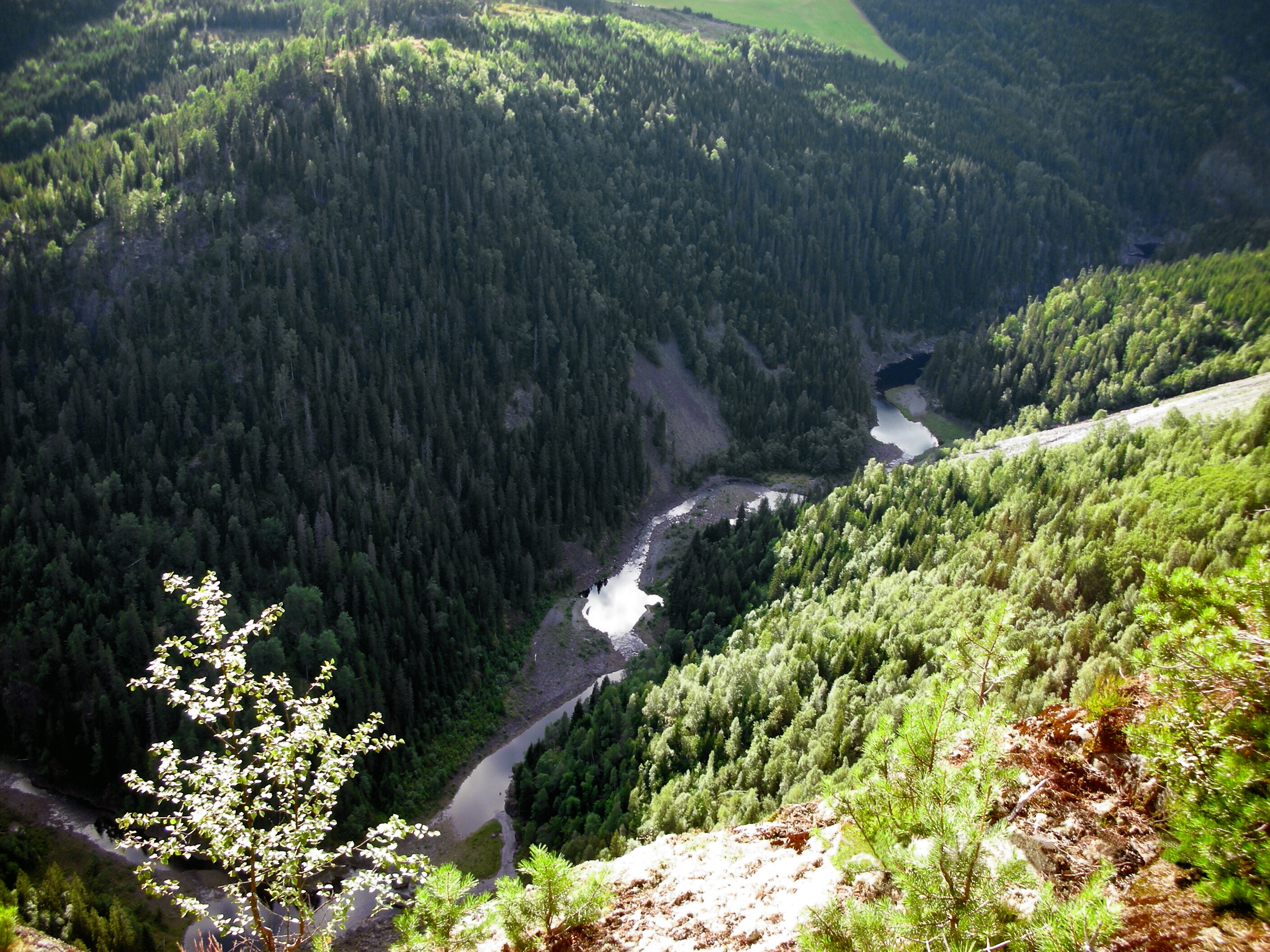
- The river Tokke viewed from Ravnejuvet

Location
- Country: Norway
- County: Telemark
- Municipality: Vinje Municipality

Physical characteristics
- Source: Totak lake
  - location: Vinje, Norway
  - coordinates: 59.645670°N 8.015127°E
  - elevation: 687 metres (2,254 ft)
- Mouth: Bandak lake
  - location: Dalen, Norway
  - coordinates: 59.4393477°N 8.0165648°E
  - elevation: 70 metres (230 ft)
- Length: 35 km (22 mi)

Basin features
- Tributaries
  - right: Vinjeåi

Tokke is a river in Telemark county, Norway. The river is about 35-kilometre (22 mi) long and it flows through Vinje Municipality and Tokke Municipality, between the lakes Totak and Bandak. The Tokke river system was regulated for hydroelectric power generation between 1959 and 1979. During this time, seven hydroelectric power stations with a combined installed capacity of 976 megawatts (1,309,000 hp) were constructed along the river and its tributaries. The power stations have an average annual production of 4,492 gigawatt-hours (16,170 TJ).

== See also ==
- List of rivers in Norway
