= Seljord Municipality =

Municipality in Telemark, Norway

Seljord Municipality Seljord kommune
- Municipality
- Sillejord herred (historic name); Silgjord herred (historic name)
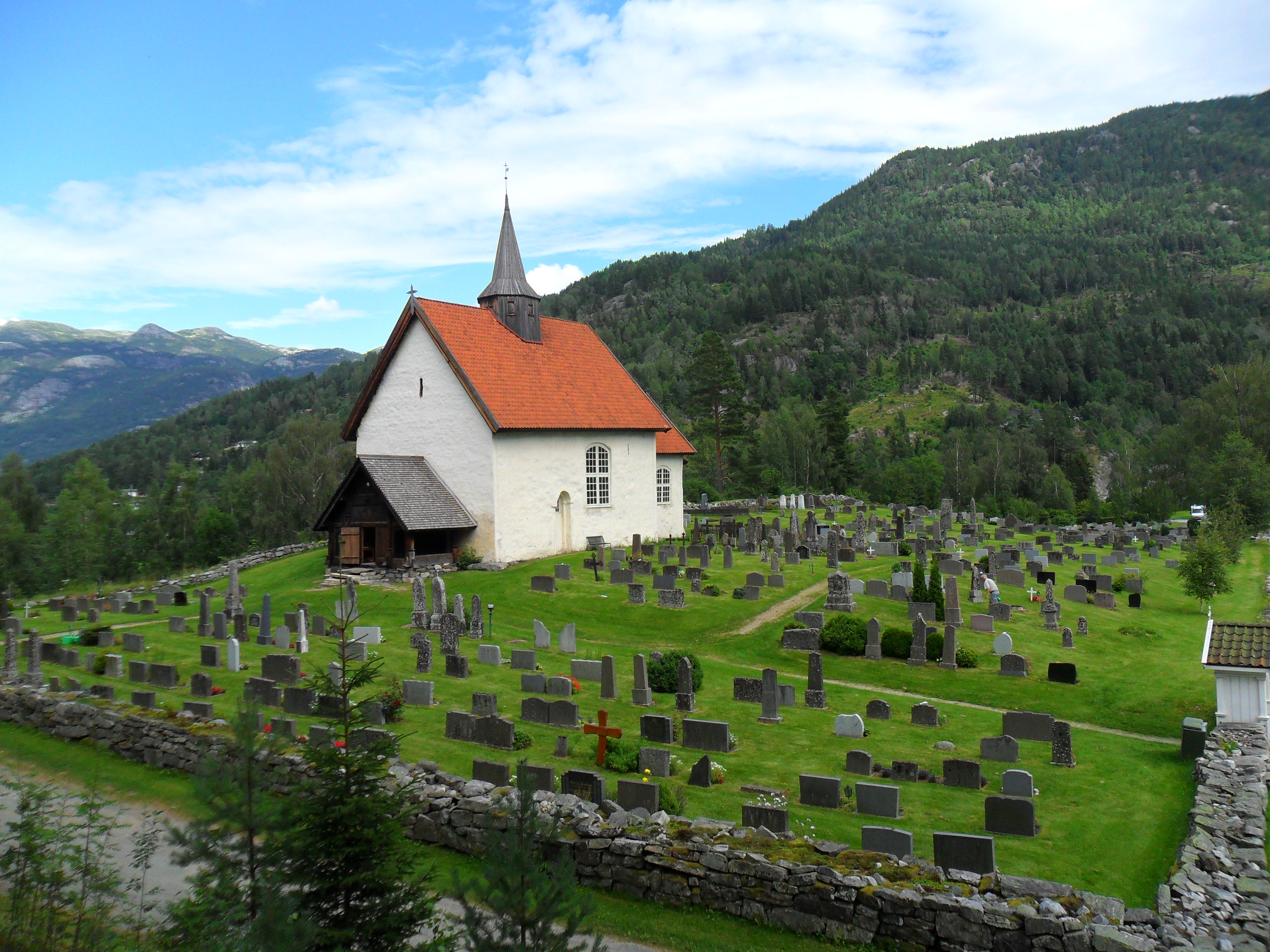
- View of the local Seljord Church

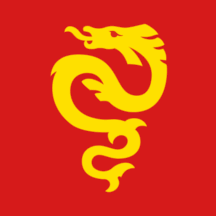
- Flag Coat of arms

- Telemark within Norway

- Seljord within Telemark
- Coordinates: 59°30′48″N 8°38′56″E
- Country: Norway
- County: Telemark
- District: Vest-Telemark
- Established: 1 Jan 1838
  - Created as: Formannskapsdistrikt
- Administrative centre: Seljord

Government
  - Mayor (2023): Solveig Sundbø Abrahamsen (H)

Area
  - Total: 715.08 km^{2} (276.09 sq mi)
  - Land: 669.28 km^{2} (258.41 sq mi)
  - Water: 45.8 km^{2} (17.7 sq mi) 6.4%
  - Rank: #161 in Norway
- Highest elevation: 1,539.99 m (5,052.5 ft)

Population (2026)
  - Total: 2,959
  - Rank: #230 in Norway
  - Density: 4.4/km^{2} (11/sq mi)
  - Change (10 years): ▼ −1.1%
- Demonym: Seljording

Official language
  - Norwegian form: Nynorsk
- Time zone: UTC+01:00 (CET)
  - Summer (DST): UTC+02:00 (CEST)
- ISO 3166 code: NO-4022
- Website: Official website

Seljord (Norwegian pronunciation: [ˈsæɭjuːr]; locally [ˈsɪʎjuːr]) is a municipality in Telemark county, Norway. It is located in the traditional district of Vest-Telemark and the larger Øvre Telemark. The administrative centre of the municipality is the village of Seljord. Other villages in the municipality include Flatdal and Åmotsdal.

The 715.08-square-kilometre (276.09 sq mi) municipality is the 161st largest by area out of the 357 municipalities in Norway. Seljord Municipality is the 230th most populous municipality in Norway with a population of 2,959. The municipality's population density is 4.4 inhabitants per square kilometre (11/sq mi) and its population has decreased by 1.1% over the previous 10-year period.

Seljord is famous for its sea serpent, Selma, who allegedly lives in the lake Seljordsvatnet. The yearly Dyrsku'n market, held since 1866, attracts 60,000 to 80,000 visitors each year. The large fair started as a show of farm animals. More recently, it also includes a huge market with vendors selling a variety of goods including base layer clothing, Bergans outdoors equipment, crafts, and food. Amusement rides are also featured. Seljord folk high school is located in Seljord. The school offers a variety of courses including outdoor adventure, theater, music, and art.

== General information ==
=== Administrative history ===
The formannskapsdistrikt law of 1837 created a system of local government in Norway by establishing each town (ladested or kjøpstad) and each Church of Norway prestegjeld as a civil municipality. On 1 January 1838, Sillejord prestegejdl was established as Sillejord Municipality (later spelled Seljord).

On 11 October 1873, an unpopulated area of Kviteseid Municipality was transferred to Seljord Municipality. On 1 January 1883, an area of southeastern Seljord Municipality (population: 235) was transferred to the neighboring Bø Municipality. On 23 January 1905, an unpopulated part of Hjartdal Municipality was transferred into Seljord Municipality.

In 2020, there were many municipal and county mergers across Norway due to the work of the Solberg cabinet. Historically, this municipality was part of Telemark county. On 1 January 2020, the municipality became a part of the newly-formed Vestfold og Telemark county (after Telemark and Vestfold counties were merged). The merger was shortlived, and on 1 January 2024, the merger was undone and this municipality became part of Telemark county once again.

=== Name ===
The municipality is named after the old Seljord prestegjeld. The prestegjeld was named after the old Seljord farm (Old Norse: Seljugerði) since the first Seljord Church was built there. The first element is the genitive case of the word selja which means "sallow-tree" or "willow". The last element is gerði which means "field". Prior to 1889, the name was spelled Silgjord or Sillejord.

=== Coat of arms ===
The coat of arms was granted on 15 September 1989. The official blazon is "Gules, a sea serpent Or" (Norwegian: På raud grunn ein gull sjøorm). This means the arms have a red field (background) and the charge is a sea serpent. The charge has a tincture of Or which means it is commonly colored yellow, but if it is made out of metal, then gold is used. The design symbolizes the local legend of a sea serpent named Selma who allegedly lives in the lake Seljordsvatn. The arms were designed by Trygve Magnus Barstad. The municipal flag has the same design as the coat of arms.

=== Churches ===
The Church of Norway has one parish (sokn) within Seljord Municipality. It is part of the Øvre Telemark prosti (deanery) in the Diocese of Agder og Telemark.

Churches in Seljord Municipality
Parish (sokn)	Church name	Location of the church	Year built
Seljord	Flatdal Church	Flatdal	1654
Seljord	Mandal Chapel	Mandal	1954
Seljord	Seljord Church	Seljord	1180
Seljord	Åmotsdal Church	Åmotsdal	1792

== Geography ==
The municipality lies in the central part of Øvre Telemark. There are two large lakes in the municipality: Sundsbarmvatn and Seljordsvatn. The highest point in the municipality is the 1,539.99-metre (5,052.5 ft) tall mountain Brattefjell which is located in the northern part of the municipality. Tinn Municipality lies to the north, Hjartdal Municipality lies to the northeast, Notodden Municipality lies to the east, Midt-Telemark Municipality lies to the southeast, Kviteseid Municipality lies to the south, Tokke Municipality lies to the west, and Vinje Municipality lies to the northwest.

== Government ==
Seljord Municipality is responsible for primary education (through 10th grade), outpatient health services, senior citizen services, welfare and other social services, zoning, economic development, and municipal roads and utilities. The municipality is governed by a municipal council of directly elected representatives. The mayor is indirectly elected by a vote of the municipal council. The municipality is under the jurisdiction of the Øvre Telemark District Court and the Agder Court of Appeal.

=== Municipal council ===
The municipal council (Kommunestyre) of Seljord Municipality is made up of 17 representatives that are elected to four-year terms. The tables below show the current and historical composition of the council by political party.

Seljord kommunestyre 2023–2027
Party name (in Nynorsk)	Number of representatives
Labour Party (Arbeidarpartiet)	4
Progress Party (Framstegspartiet)	4
Conservative Party (Høgre)	5
Red Party (Raudt)	1
Centre Party (Senterpartiet)	3
Total number of members:	17

Seljord kommunestyre 2019–2023
Party name (in Nynorsk)	Number of representatives
Labour Party (Arbeidarpartiet)	3
Progress Party (Framstegspartiet)	2
Green Party (Miljøpartiet Dei Grøne)	2
Conservative Party (Høgre)	3
Centre Party (Senterpartiet)	7
Total number of members:	17

Seljord kommunestyre 2015–2019
Party name (in Nynorsk)	Number of representatives
Labour Party (Arbeidarpartiet)	6
Progress Party (Framstegspartiet)	1
Green Party (Miljøpartiet Dei Grøne)	1
Conservative Party (Høgre)	5
Christian Democratic Party (Kristeleg Folkeparti)	1
Centre Party (Senterpartiet)	6
Liberal Party (Venstre)	1
Total number of members:	21

Seljord kommunestyre 2011–2015
Party name (in Nynorsk)	Number of representatives
Labour Party (Arbeidarpartiet)	4
Progress Party (Framstegspartiet)	2
Conservative Party (Høgre)	8
Christian Democratic Party (Kristeleg Folkeparti)	3
Centre Party (Senterpartiet)	2
Socialist Left Party (Sosialistisk Venstreparti)	1
Liberal Party (Venstre)	1
Total number of members:	21

Seljord kommunestyre 2007–2011
Party name (in Nynorsk)	Number of representatives
Labour Party (Arbeidarpartiet)	7
Progress Party (Framstegspartiet)	3
Conservative Party (Høgre)	4
Christian Democratic Party (Kristeleg Folkeparti)	4
Centre Party (Senterpartiet)	3
Socialist Left Party (Sosialistisk Venstreparti)	2
Liberal Party (Venstre)	2
Total number of members:	25

Seljord kommunestyre 2003–2007
Party name (in Nynorsk)	Number of representatives
Labour Party (Arbeidarpartiet)	6
Progress Party (Framstegspartiet)	3
Conservative Party (Høgre)	6
Christian Democratic Party (Kristeleg Folkeparti)	2
Centre Party (Senterpartiet)	4
Socialist Left Party (Sosialistisk Venstreparti)	3
Liberal Party (Venstre)	1
Total number of members:	25

Seljord kommunestyre 1999–2003
Party name (in Nynorsk)	Number of representatives
Labour Party (Arbeidarpartiet)	6
Conservative Party (Høgre)	7
Christian Democratic Party (Kristeleg Folkeparti)	3
Centre Party (Senterpartiet)	6
Socialist Left Party (Sosialistisk Venstreparti)	2
Liberal Party (Venstre)	1
Total number of members:	25

Seljord kommunestyre 1995–1999
Party name (in Nynorsk)	Number of representatives
Labour Party (Arbeidarpartiet)	7
Conservative Party (Høgre)	4
Christian Democratic Party (Kristeleg Folkeparti)	2
Centre Party (Senterpartiet)	9
Socialist Left Party (Sosialistisk Venstreparti)	2
Liberal Party (Venstre)	1
Total number of members:	25

Seljord kommunestyre 1991–1995
Party name (in Nynorsk)	Number of representatives
Labour Party (Arbeidarpartiet)	10
Conservative Party (Høgre)	3
Christian Democratic Party (Kristeleg Folkeparti)	3
Centre Party (Senterpartiet)	7
Socialist Left Party (Sosialistisk Venstreparti)	3
Liberal Party (Venstre)	1
Total number of members:	27

Seljord kommunestyre 1987–1991
Party name (in Nynorsk)	Number of representatives
Labour Party (Arbeidarpartiet)	11
Conservative Party (Høgre)	5
Christian Democratic Party (Kristeleg Folkeparti)	3
Centre Party (Senterpartiet)	3
Socialist Left Party (Sosialistisk Venstreparti)	1
Liberal Party (Venstre)	4
Total number of members:	27

Seljord kommunestyre 1983–1987
Party name (in Nynorsk)	Number of representatives
Labour Party (Arbeidarpartiet)	11
Conservative Party (Høgre)	5
Christian Democratic Party (Kristeleg Folkeparti)	4
Centre Party (Senterpartiet)	3
Socialist Left Party (Sosialistisk Venstreparti)	2
Liberal Party (Venstre)	2
Total number of members:	27

Seljord kommunestyre 1979–1983
Party name (in Nynorsk)	Number of representatives
Labour Party (Arbeidarpartiet)	10
Conservative Party (Høgre)	5
Christian Democratic Party (Kristeleg Folkeparti)	5
Centre Party (Senterpartiet)	3
Socialist Left Party (Sosialistisk Venstreparti)	2
Liberal Party (Venstre)	2
Total number of members:	27

Seljord kommunestyre 1975–1979
Party name (in Nynorsk)	Number of representatives
Labour Party (Arbeidarpartiet)	10
Christian Democratic Party (Kristeleg Folkeparti)	6
Socialist Left Party (Sosialistisk Venstreparti)	1
Joint List(s) of Non-Socialist Parties (Borgarlege Felleslister)	8
Cross-party local list (Tverrpolitisk Bygdeliste)	2
Total number of members:	27

Seljord kommunestyre 1971–1975
Party name (in Nynorsk)	Number of representatives
Labour Party (Arbeidarpartiet)	13
Joint List(s) of Non-Socialist Parties (Borgarlege Felleslister)	14
Total number of members:	27

Seljord kommunestyre 1967–1971
Party name (in Nynorsk)	Number of representatives
Labour Party (Arbeidarpartiet)	13
Joint List(s) of Non-Socialist Parties (Borgarlege Felleslister)	14
Total number of members:	27

Seljord kommunestyre 1963–1967
Party name (in Nynorsk)	Number of representatives
Labour Party (Arbeidarpartiet)	13
Joint List(s) of Non-Socialist Parties (Borgarlege Felleslister)	14
Total number of members:	27

Seljord heradsstyre 1959–1963
Party name (in Nynorsk)	Number of representatives
Labour Party (Arbeidarpartiet)	13
Joint List(s) of Non-Socialist Parties (Borgarlege Felleslister)	14
Total number of members:	27

Seljord heradsstyre 1955–1959
Party name (in Nynorsk)	Number of representatives
Labour Party (Arbeidarpartiet)	14
Joint List(s) of Non-Socialist Parties (Borgarlege Felleslister)	13
Total number of members:	27

Seljord heradsstyre 1951–1955
Party name (in Nynorsk)	Number of representatives
Labour Party (Arbeidarpartiet)	11
Joint List(s) of Non-Socialist Parties (Borgarlege Felleslister)	13
Total number of members:	24

Seljord heradsstyre 1947–1951
Party name (in Nynorsk)	Number of representatives
Labour Party (Arbeidarpartiet)	9
Joint list of the Liberal Party (Venstre) and the Radical People's Party (Radikale Folkepartiet)	3
Joint List(s) of Non-Socialist Parties (Borgarlege Felleslister)	12
Total number of members:	24

Seljord heradsstyre 1945–1947
Party name (in Nynorsk)	Number of representatives
Local List(s) (Lokale lister)	24
Total number of members:	24

Seljord heradsstyre 1937–1941*
Party name (in Nynorsk)	Number of representatives
Labour Party (Arbeidarpartiet)	10
Liberal Party (Venstre)	5
Joint list of the Farmers' Party (Bondepartiet) and the Liberal Party (Venstre)	5
Joint List(s) of Non-Socialist Parties (Borgarlege Felleslister)	4
Total number of members:	24
Note: Due to the German occupation of Norway during World War II, no elections were held for new municipal councils until after the war ended in 1945.

=== Mayors ===
The mayor (Nynorsk: ordførar) of Seljord Municipality is the political leader of the municipality and the chairperson of the municipal council. The following people have held this position:

- 1838–1839: Rev. Mauritz Thønnessen
- 1840–1844: Paul Hjelm-Hansen
- 1844–1845: Aasmund L. Grave
- 1845–1849: Rev. Magnus Brostrup Landstad
- 1849–1851: Aasmund L. Grave
- 1851–1852: Eivind Høyesen Nordgarden
- 1852–1859: Johan Nikolai Berge
- 1860–1867: Jens Thue
- 1868–1869: Thomas Thomesen
- 1870–1873: Halvor Olsen Mæland
- 1873–1875: Eivind Høyesen Nordgarden
- 1875–1876: Mr. Valløe
- 1876–1877: Eivind Høyesen Nordgarden
- 1878–1884: Jørund Telnes
- 1884–1885: Sigurd Nes
- 1886–1887: Jørund Telnes
- 1888–1891: Sigurd Nes
- 1892–1893: Eivind Knutson Sundbø
- 1894–1895: Gunleik Norgaren
- 1896–1897: Halvor Sveinungson Haugstoga
- 1898–1900: Gunleik Norgaren
- 1901–1902: Viggo Ullmann
- 1902–1904: Tarje Lindstøl
- 1905–1914: Aslak Groven
- 1914–1916: Steinar Aase
- 1917–1919: Aslak Groven
- 1920–1922: Steinar Aase
- 1923–1925: Tov Trahaug
- 1926–1929: Jørund Strand
- 1929–1931: Hans Sandsdalen
- 1932–1934: Tov Trahaug
- 1935–1940: Lavrants Rui
- 1941–1942: Knut Lofthus (NS)
- 1942–1943: Håkon Svenneby (NS)
- 1944–1945: Olav L. Bjørge (NS)
- 1945–1945: Lavrants Rui
- 1946–1947: Andreas Sandsdalen (Ap)
- 1947–1955: Eivind Øverland (V)
- 1955–1957: Olav H. Sandsdalen (Ap)
- 1957–1959: Sveinung Aase
- 1959–1967: Eivind Øverland (V)
- 1967–1975: Eivind K. Kvaale (V)
- 1975–1979: Halvor J. Svartdal (LL)
- 1979–1983: Olaf Slaaen (V)
- 1983–1987: Gunnar Haugen (Ap)
- 1987–1991: Oddmund Gåskjenn (Ap)
- 1991–1995: Olav Sollid (H)
- 1995–1999: John Kleivstaul (Sp)
- 1999–2003: Edvard Mæland (H)
- 2003–2007: John Kleivstaul (Sp)
- 2007–2013: Solveig Sundbø Abrahamsen (H)
- 2013–2015: Jon Svartdal (KrF)
- 2015–2019: Halfdan Haugan (Ap)
- 2019–2023: Beate Marie Dahl Eide (Sp)
- 2023–present: Solveig Sundbø Abrahamsen (H)

== Media gallery ==
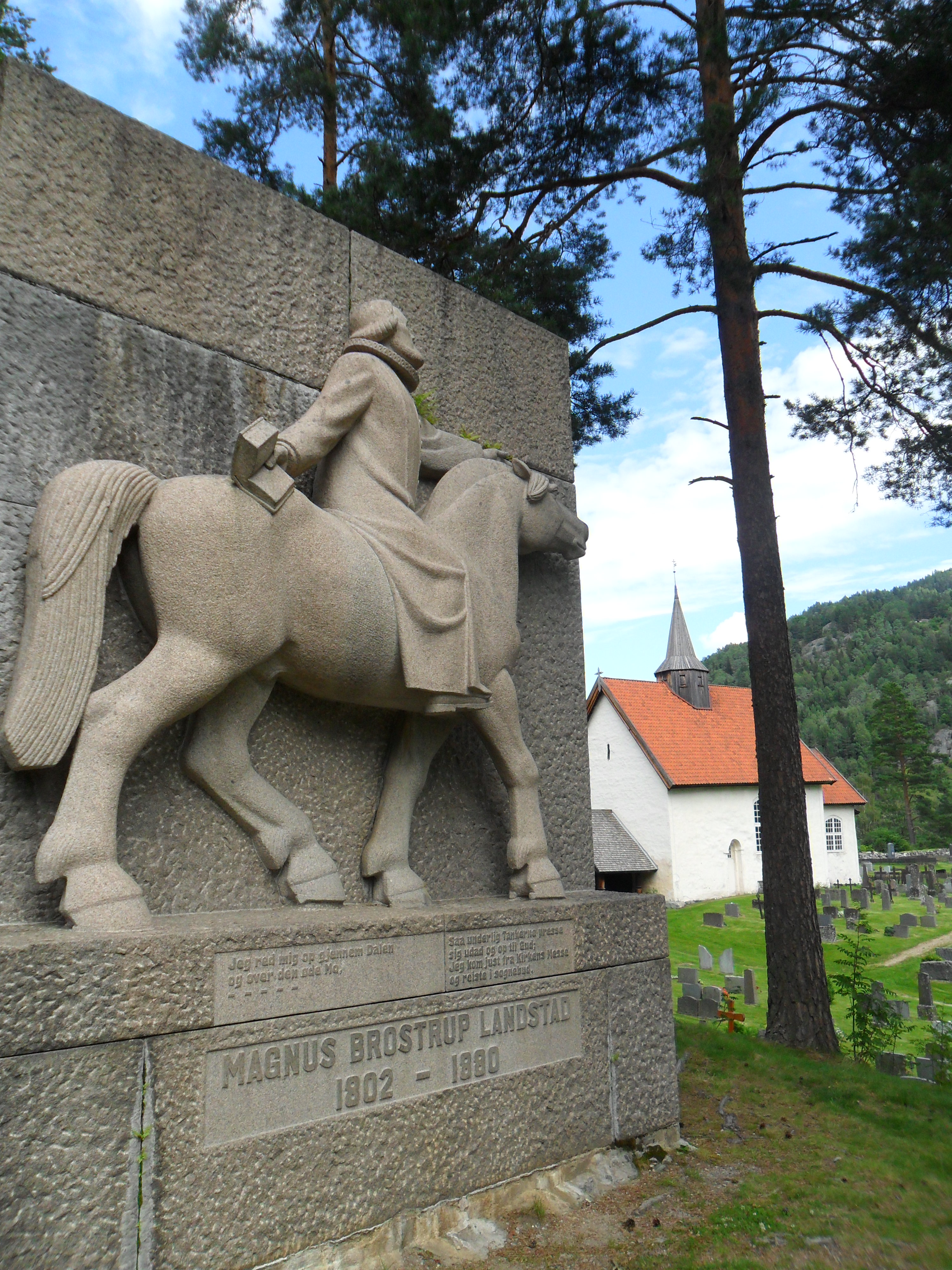
Memorial to Magnus Brostrup Landstad

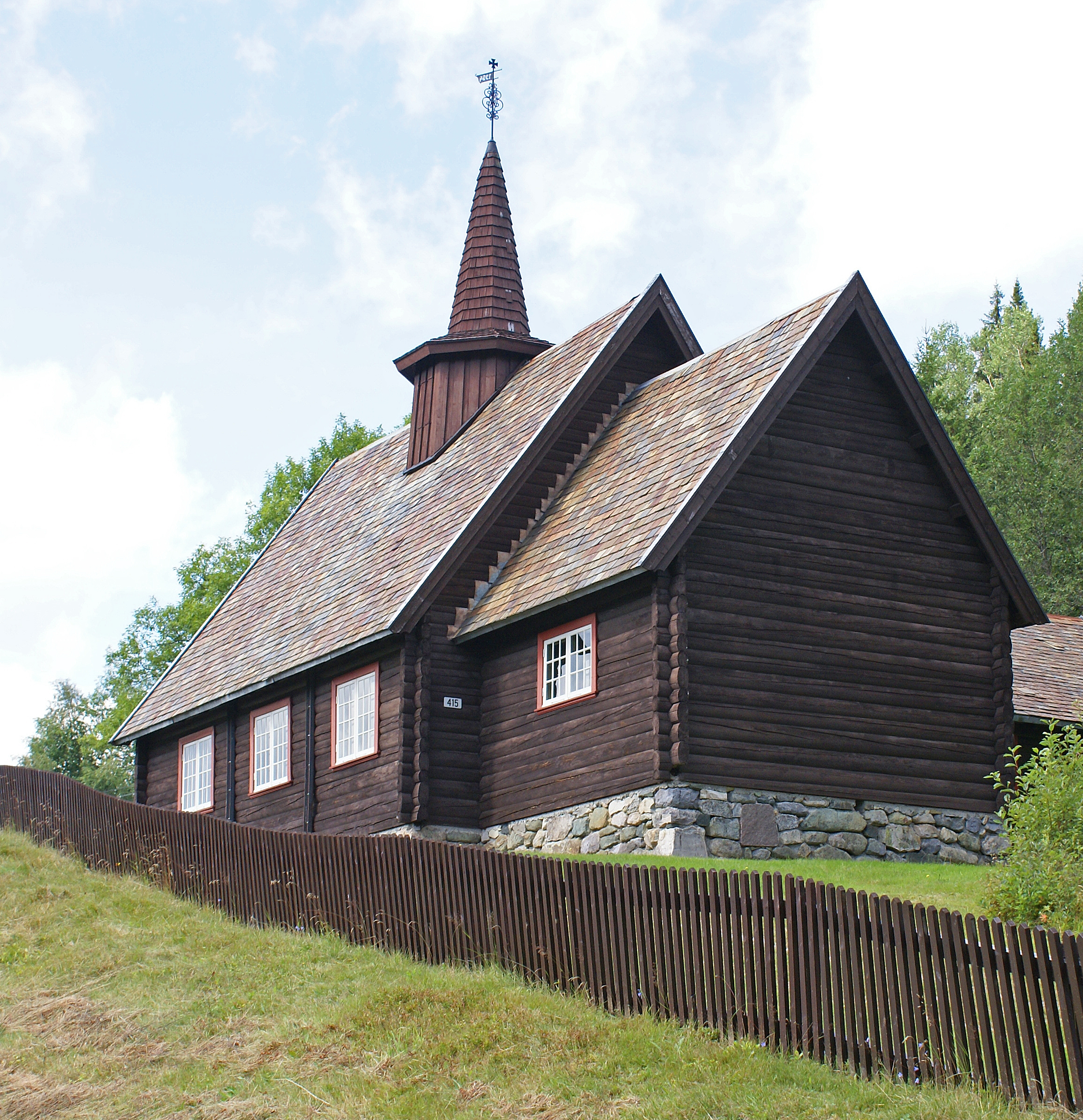
Mandal Chapel

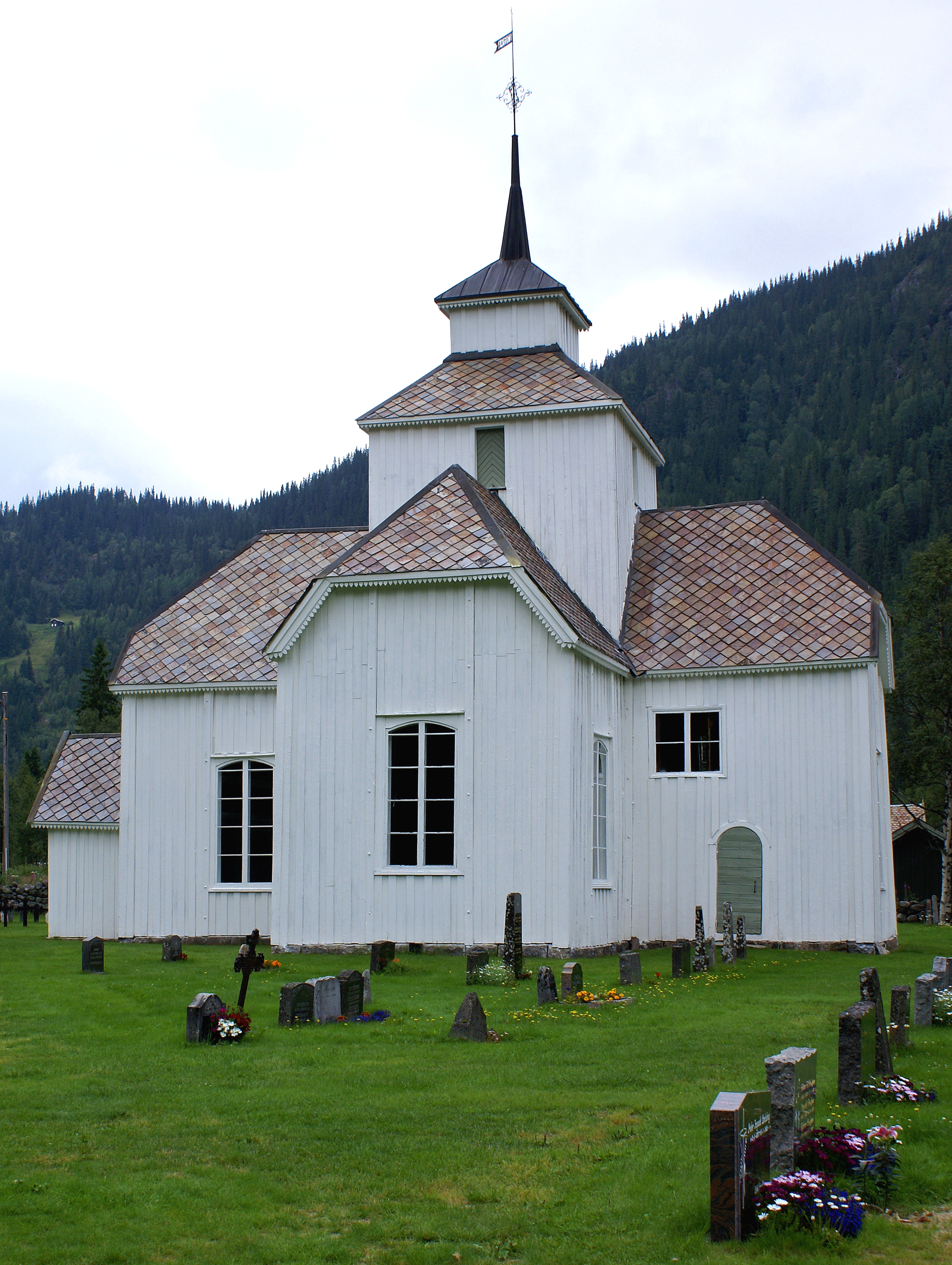
Åmotsdal Church

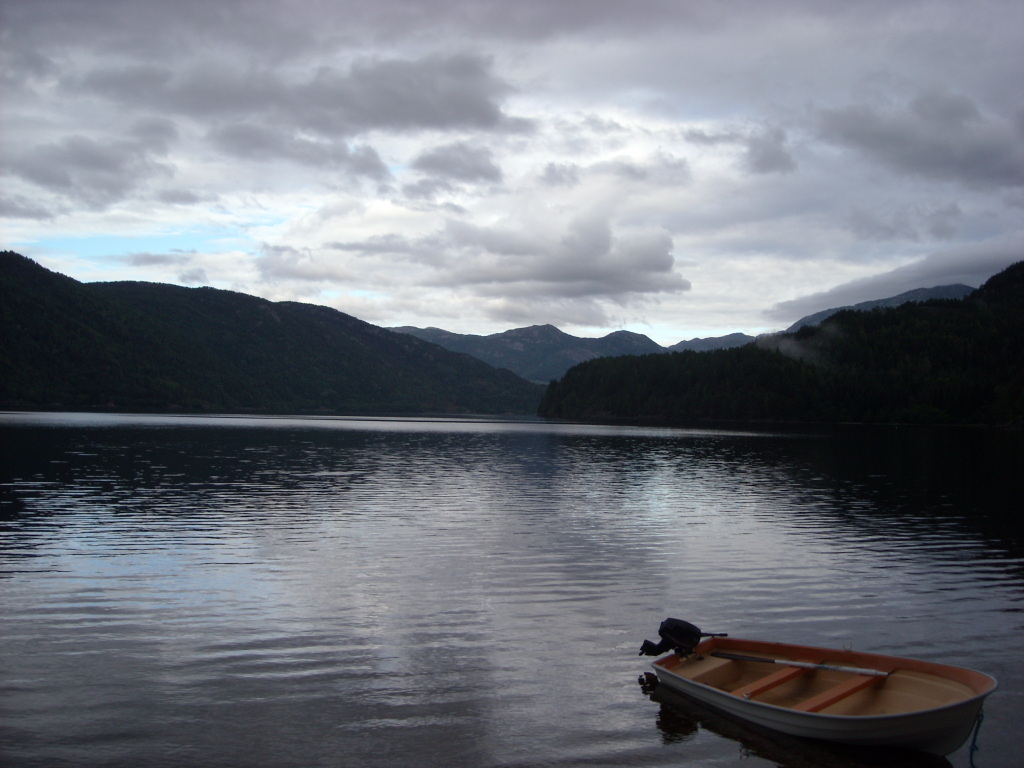
Lake Seljord (Seljordsvatnet)

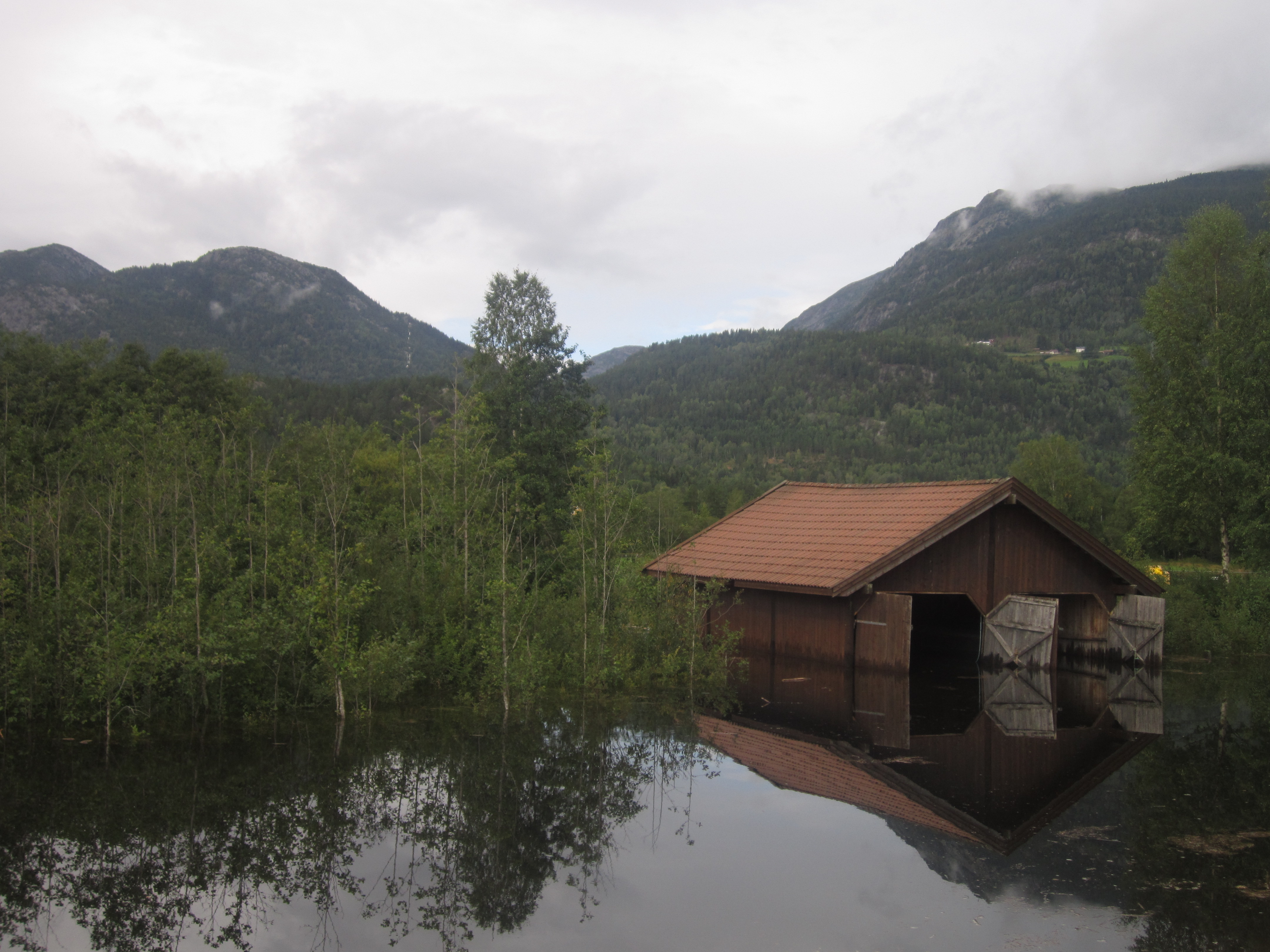
Flooded boathouse in Seljord

== Notable people ==
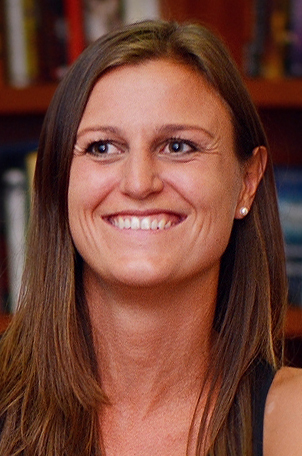
Helga Flatland, 2016

- Anne Godlid (1773-1863), a 19th-century storyteller
- Jacob Andreas Wille (1777–1850), a priest, teacher, and Mayor of Seljord Municipality
- Daniel Bremer Juell (1808-1855), the Bishop of Tromsø from 1849-1855
- Jørund Telnes (1845-1892), a farmer, teacher, writer, and Mayor of Seljord
- Halvor J. Sandsdalen (1911-1998), a writer and folklore collector
- Ingebjørg Kasin Sandsdalen (1915-2003), a poet
- Aslaug Høydal (1916-2007), a schoolteacher, novelist, poet, and children's writer
- Terje Grøstad (1925–2011), a painter and illustrator who lived in Flatdal
- Hallvard Flatland (born 1957), a TV personality
- Kim Leine (born 1961), a Danish-Norwegian author
- Helga Flatland (born 1984), a novelist and children's writer who was brought up in Flatdal
