= Seljord =

Seljord may refer to:

== Places ==
- Seljord Municipality, a municipality in Telemark county, Norway
- Seljord (village), a village within Seljord Municipality in Telemark county, Norway
- Seljord Church, a church in Seljord Municipality in Telemark county, Norway
- Lake Seljord, a lake in Seljord Municipality in Telemark county, Norway
- Seljord prestegjeld, a former geographic subdivision of the Church of Norway in Telemark county

== Other ==
- Seljord IL, a sports club from Seljord Municipality in Telemark county, Norway
