= Anne Godlid =

Norwegian storyteller

- Born: c. 1773; Synsttveiten, Seljord, Vest-Telemark, Norway
- Died: c. 1863
- Other names: Anne Golid, Anne Golið, Anne Gólid
- Occupation: Storyteller

Anne Olsdotter Godlid (sometimes spelled Golid, Golið, and Gólid; c. 1773—c. 1863) was a well-known Norwegian storyteller from Seljord, Telemark, Norway. She was noted for her excellent memory and proved an invaluable resource for collectors and Jørgen Moe, Magnus Brostrup Landstad, and Olea Crøger.

According to Rikard Berge, Godlid was born on Synsttveiten in Vest-Telemark, Norway in 1773, though this is disputed; others believe she was born in 1777. Godlid lived with her parents, Olav and Gunnhild Synsttveiten, and worked on their farm for many years along with her 5 siblings, which included a sister, Kjersti, and two brothers, Nerid/Nirid and Tov. Nerid was a skipper. He is the subject of a story Godlid shared: one night, on December 24, he was sailing off the coast of China, thinking about his pregnant wife back in Norway. A fellow sailor told Nerid he could go check on his family to make sure they were okay. The sailor laid on upon the floor and closed his eyes. Some versions say the man returned with a silver spoon Nerid recognized from his own home, while others say he imparted information to Nerid that was later found to be true. Nerid is thought to have drowned on a subsequent voyage. Godlid believed her family was descended from Olav Mannslagar, also known as Olav Garvik.

Godlid's appearance is described as "scary;" her black hair was coarse like "on a pig" and when she cut it in later life, it stood up "like a comb." She had a big nose and as an elder walked with a hunch and cane. Berge described her as tough, strong, and wise, but also cheerful and maternal. She enjoyed liquor and "took tobacco like a man." Berge wrote that she was beautiful in her youth, but as an adult, "the ugliest creature you should ever see." Landstad's mother said she looked like a mountain troll. Godlid also walked around town mumbling to herself in her later years; it was said she communicated with another realm.

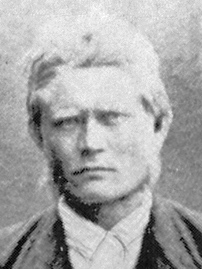
Godlid's grandson Olav Tjønnstaul

Godlid married Jørn Uppebøen, a wealthy widow from Utgarden, at age 40; he died around 20 years later. The couple had two children: Olav, who died soon after birth, and Ingebjørge, who was named after her father's first wife. Jørn also had five children from his first marriage: Halvor I, Aslaug, Gunhild, Aaste, and Halvor II. Ingebjørge married and had 8 children, two of which were folklorist Knut Loupedalen and storyteller/fiddler Olav Sondreson Tjønnstaul. Her great-grandson was musician Jørgen Tjønnstaul (1894—1985). Jørgen was left on his own from a young age after his parents and siblings died from illness around 1907.

Godlid struggled with money after her husband's death; she may have made money and secured housing in exchange for storytelling. She sat with Jørgen Moe in 1842 and with Magnus Brostrup Landstad for eight days to share her stories. Throughout the years, Godlid's unique way of storytelling has been lost and little remains of her original material. The tale The Master Maid is based on a story told by Godlid; in another story, Godlid details how she and her dog Birna encountered a mother bear protecting her cubs but Godlid walked away unharmed. Berge wrote: "She carried with her one of the greatest treasures of old folklore found in one single person. Therefore, her name is worth remembering." Similarly, Landstand said: "It is not possible to write it all down, what´s inside that grey head." Around 100 of Godlid's stories were ultimately written down, many much later by her great-grandson Olav, but she was likely to have many more tales to tell.

Godlid's date of death is also disputed, as the church did not note it, but she is believed to have been over 90 years old at the time of her death. Berge wrote that she died on April 11, 1863, though this would have made her about 84.
