= Olea Crøger =

Norwegian folk song collector

Olea Crøger (July 17, 1801 – November 21, 1855) was a Norwegian music teacher who was a pioneer in the collection of folk music and folklore. She is considered to have been one of the first to systematically collect folk songs and melodies in Telemark.

Olea Styhr Crøger was born in Heddal in Telemark county, Norway. She was the daughter of Johannes Crøger (1753–1830) and Helle Margrethe Neumann (1764–1849). She was the daughter of a parish priest and a mother who taught her song and music. As an adult, she taught singing at Kviteseid Seminar, one of the first public teacher's college in Norway.

On her own, she began to collect old folk songs and melodies. By one account, she responded to the call for citizens to collect disappearing vestiges of Norwegian folk balladry. These first appeared in Samling AF Sange, Folkeviser Og Stev I Norske Almuedialekter, the folklore collection of Jørgen Moe first published 1840. This material was published in an enlarged edition in 1869 which was accompanied by melodies edited by Ludvig Mathias Lindeman. However, Moe's 1840 anthology was not a bona fide ballad collection with the exception of two or three pieces, and by the time Moe met Crøger in 1842, she had already compiled a substantial collection of genuine ballads. The Norwegian ballad texts and tunes she collected in the 1840s onward were eventually published through Magnus Brostrup Landstad's Norske folkeviser (1853), which re-edited the raw ballad texts in composite form and normalized spelling. Her collected ballads also comprised a good part of Lindeman's later melody collections.

The contribution by Olea Crøger as pioneer collector of folk ballad and melody had been underappreciated until the 20th century. Modern folk ballad archivist Øystein Gaukstad has analyzed this in his survey of the history of ballad collecting. The first 57 melodies in L. M. Lindeman's transcription of 1851 were essentially the melodies she collected, (Note: "De første 57 melodiene i opptegnelsene fra 1851 er melodier som Lindeman..fra Olea Crøger") as were 33 of the 114 melodies appended to Landstad's Norske folkeviser (1853). (Note: "33 av de 114 melodiene i meloditilleget skyldes Olea Crøger") When Crøger engaged in the ballad collecting, she intended her own name to appear as co-contributor to the work, but Landstad merely acknowledged her in the preface. Landstad did, however, offer Crøger fair compensation for her contributions; following Crøger's death, the money went towards establishing a library in Seljord. Lindeman also stinted crediting Crøger with all but three ballads in his fifty ballad supplement of 1862, but the 1851 manuscript belies this, and Lindeman's debt to her for many more pieces is revealed. An early commentator A. P. Berggreen suspected that though Lindeman was responsible for the "editing", Crøger had done much of the "collecting".

== Other sources ==
- Beyer, Harald (1988). A History of Norwegian Literature (preview). Ardent Media. pp. 218–219.
- Knutslid, Gudrun Brauti (1982) Olea Crøger: Seljordminne om den fyrste folkevisesamlaren (Athenæum forlag) ISBN 978-8250305830
