= Solveig Sundbø Abrahamsen =

Norwegian politician (born 1963)

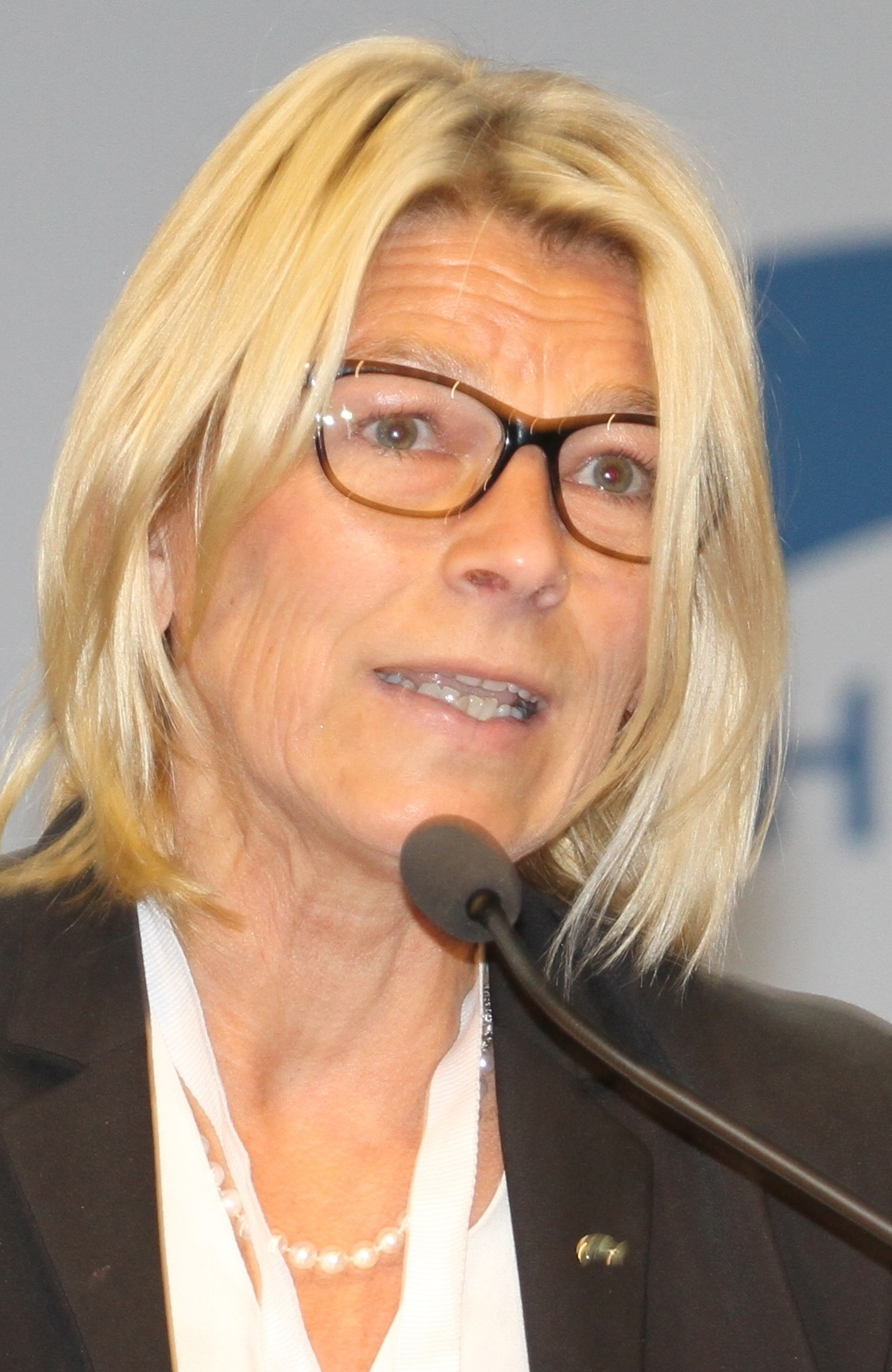
- Born: 13 September 1963 (age 62); Seljord Municipality, Norway
- Education: Telemark University College
- Occupation: Politician
- Years active: 2013-present
- Known for: Member of the Storting

Solveig Sundbø Abrahamsen (born 13 September 1963) is a Norwegian politician for the Conservative Party. She was elected as deputy to the Parliament of Norway from Telemark in 2013, and was a full member of the Storting from 2017 to 2021.

== Personal life and education ==
Born in the Seljord Municipality on 13 September 1963, Abrahamsen is a daughter of farmer Anders Sundbø and nurse Aase Prestårhus. She is educated as preschool teacher from the Telemark University College.

== Career ==
=== Local politics ===
A member of the municipal council of Seljord Municipality since 1999, Abrahamsen served as mayor of Seljord Municipality from 2007 to 2013. She was elected member of the Telemark County Council for the period 2011 to 2015.

=== Parliament ===
Abrahamsen was elected deputy representative to the Storting from the constituency of Telemark for the period 2013–2017, when she met as deputy for Torbjørn Røe Isaksen, and was member of the Standing Committee on Finance and Economic Affairs. She was elected ordinary member of the Storting for the period 2017–2021, then a member of the Standing Committee on Transport and Communications.
