= Flatdal =

Village in Seljord Municipality, Norway

- Village
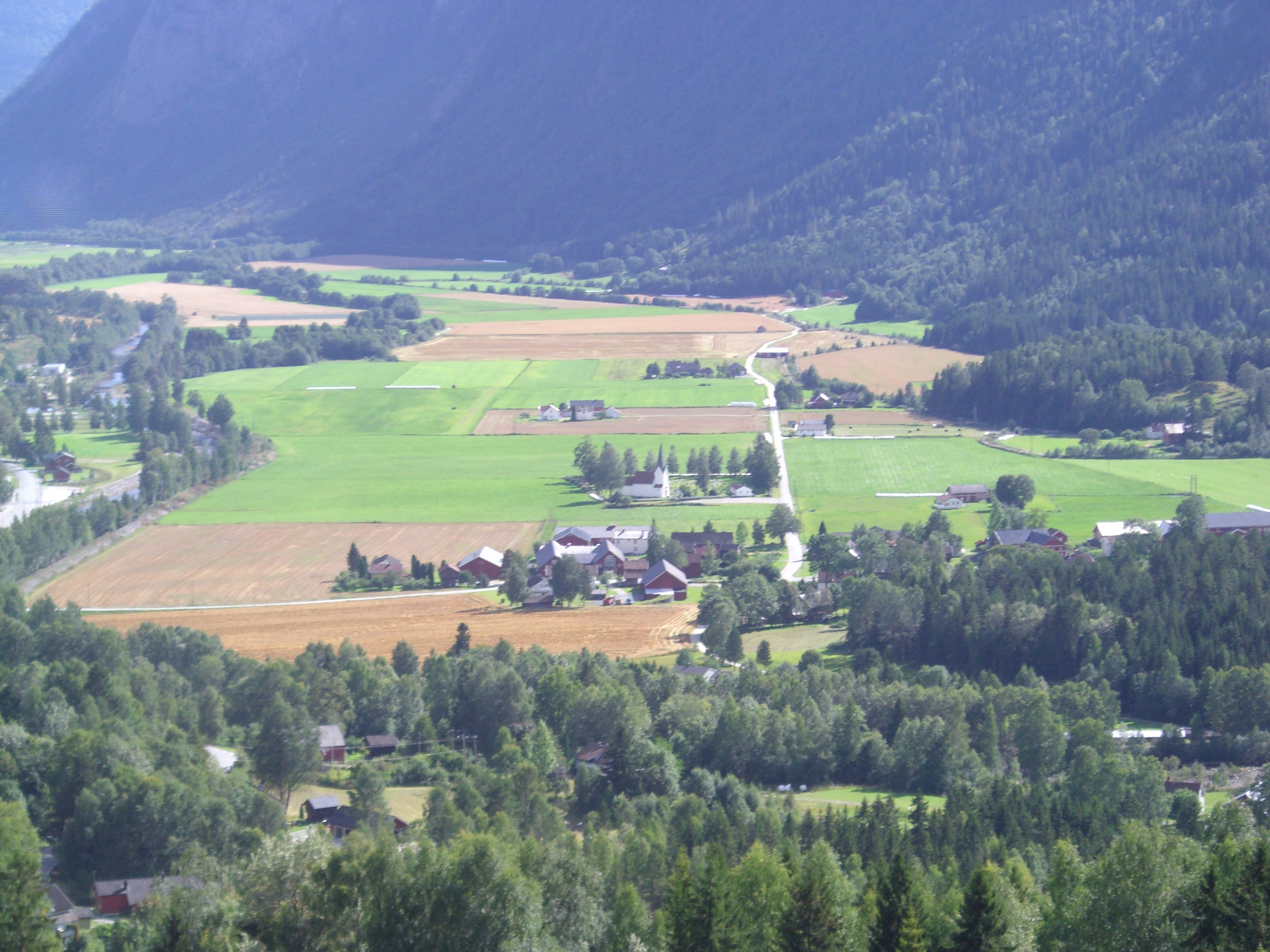
- View of the village area
- Interactive map of Flatdal
- Coordinates: 59.56783°N 8.56703°E
- Country: Norway
- Region: Eastern Norway
- County: Telemark
- District: Vest-Telemark
- Municipality: Seljord Municipality
- Elevation: 201 m (659 ft)
- Time zone: UTC+01:00 (CET)
  - Summer (DST): UTC+02:00 (CEST)
- Post Code: 3841 Flatdal

Flatdal (lit. 'Flat valley') is a village and valley in Seljord Municipality in Telemark county, Norway. Flatdal is located about 12 kilometres (7.5 mi) to the northwest of the village of Seljord and about the same distance to the southeast of the village of Åmotsdal. Flatdal Church is located in the village.

The village and valley is rather narrow with the river Flatdøla running through it into the lake Flatsjå, just north of the village of Seljord. To gain more agricultural land, the lake Flatsjå was partly drained and kept at a lower elevation. Due to this change, the river and farmland in this area is prone to flooding. Many of the homes are built on the hillsides above the valley floor.

== Notable people ==
- Terje Grøstad, a painter who settled in Flatdal
- Hallvard Flatland (born in 1957 in Flatdal), a television presenter
- Helga Flatland, a novelist who grew up in Flatdal
