= Nils Gunnar Lie =

Norwegian television personality (born 1950)

Nils Gunnar Lie (born 23 November 1950) is a Norwegian television personality.

He hails from Øystese. He started his career in the Norwegian Broadcasting Corporation, and worked on Dagsnytt and as a news anchor on Dagsrevyen. In 1989 he was awarded the Se og Hør readers' TV personality of the year award.

In 1992 he was hired by the new television channel TV 2. From 1992 to late 1997 he hosted about 180 editions of the debate program Holmgang. He also hosted the Norwegian version of Jeopardy! for a period, parallel to hosting Holmgang, but quit in April 1997 to concentrate on the latter program. From Holmgang he continued to TV 2-nyhetene as a news anchor.

In early 2005 he went from TV 2-nyhetene to the breakfast television show God morgen, Norge.

Awards
Preceded by Erik Diesen	Se og Hør's TV Personality of the Year; 1989	Succeeded by Hallvard Flatland
