= Seljordsvatn =

Lake in Telemark, Norway

- Seljordsvatnet
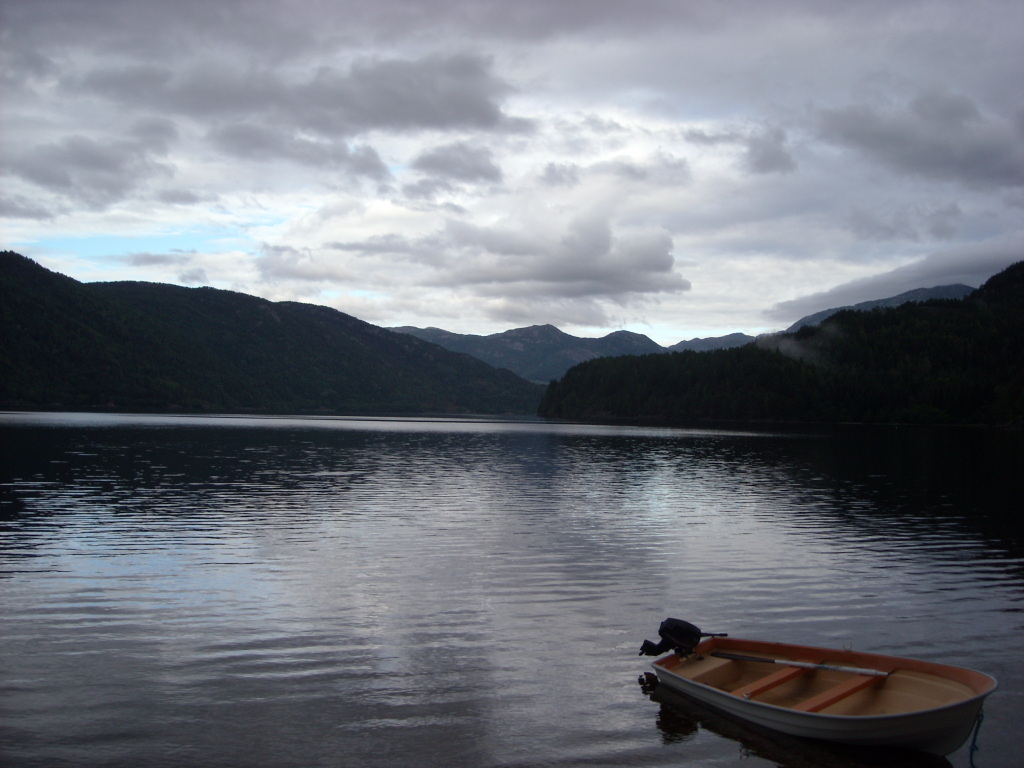
- Interactive map of Seljordsvatn
- Location: Seljord and Midt-Telemark, Telemark
- Coordinates: 59.44713°N 8.73195°E
- Type: glacier lake
- Primary inflows: Bjønndøla, Bygdaråi, Manheimbekken and Vallaråi river
- Primary outflows: Bøelva river
- Catchment area: 724.69 km^{2} (279.80 sq mi)
- Basin countries: Norway
- Max. length: 13.5 km (8.4 mi)
- Max. width: 2 km (1.2 mi)
- Surface area: 16.49 km^{2} (6.37 sq mi)
- Average depth: 49.5 m (162 ft)
- Max. depth: 145 m (476 ft)
- Water volume: 0.816 km^{3} (0.196 cu mi)
- Surface elevation: 116 m (381 ft)
- Islands: Storøy and Vesleøy
- References: NVE

Seljordsvatn (lit. 'Lake Seljord') is a lake in Seljord Municipality in Telemark county, Norway. A small part of the very far eastern edge of the lake crosses over into Midt-Telemark Municipality. The 16.49-square-kilometre (6.37 sq mi) lake is part of the Skien watershed. The lake's main inflow is the river Vallaråi and the lake drains through the river Bøelva. According to local folklore, Selma the sea serpent (Seljordsormen) lives in the lake.

The village of Seljord is located on the northwestern end of the lake. The European route E134 highway and the Norwegian National Road 36 are located on the shoreline of the lake on the northwestern and northern sides of the lake.

== See also ==
- List of lakes of Norway
