= Casino (game show) =

Norwegian game show

- Genre: Game show
- Presented by: Hallvard Flatland; Birgitte Seyffarth; Leif Erik Forberg; Kathrine Sørland
- Country of origin: Norway
- Original language: Norwegian

Original release
- Network: TVNorge; TV3 Norway
- Release: 1989 – 1996; 2003 – 2004

Casino is a Norwegian game show hosted by Hallvard Flatland. It aired on TVNorge running from 1989 to 1996.

== Casino on TVNorge ==
Hallvard Flatland presented the program from 1989 to 1993. Flatland was accompanied by former model Birgitte Seyffarth, who awarded prizes. Dressing elegantly, smiling, hugging, but never saying anything, she gave rise to the concept "Tause Birgitte" (Silent Birgitte).

Flatland's successor as presenter was Leif Erik Forberg. From 1993 the female hostess varied frequently, picked "from the street". Hostesses included later musician Lene Nystrøm and actress Janne Formoe.

== Revival on TV3 Norway ==
Casino was revived on the channel TV3 Norway, where it aired 2003–2004, and again hosted by Flatland. He was accompanied by hostess Kathrine Sørland.
