= Mandal Chapel =

Church in Telemark, Norway

- Mandal kapell
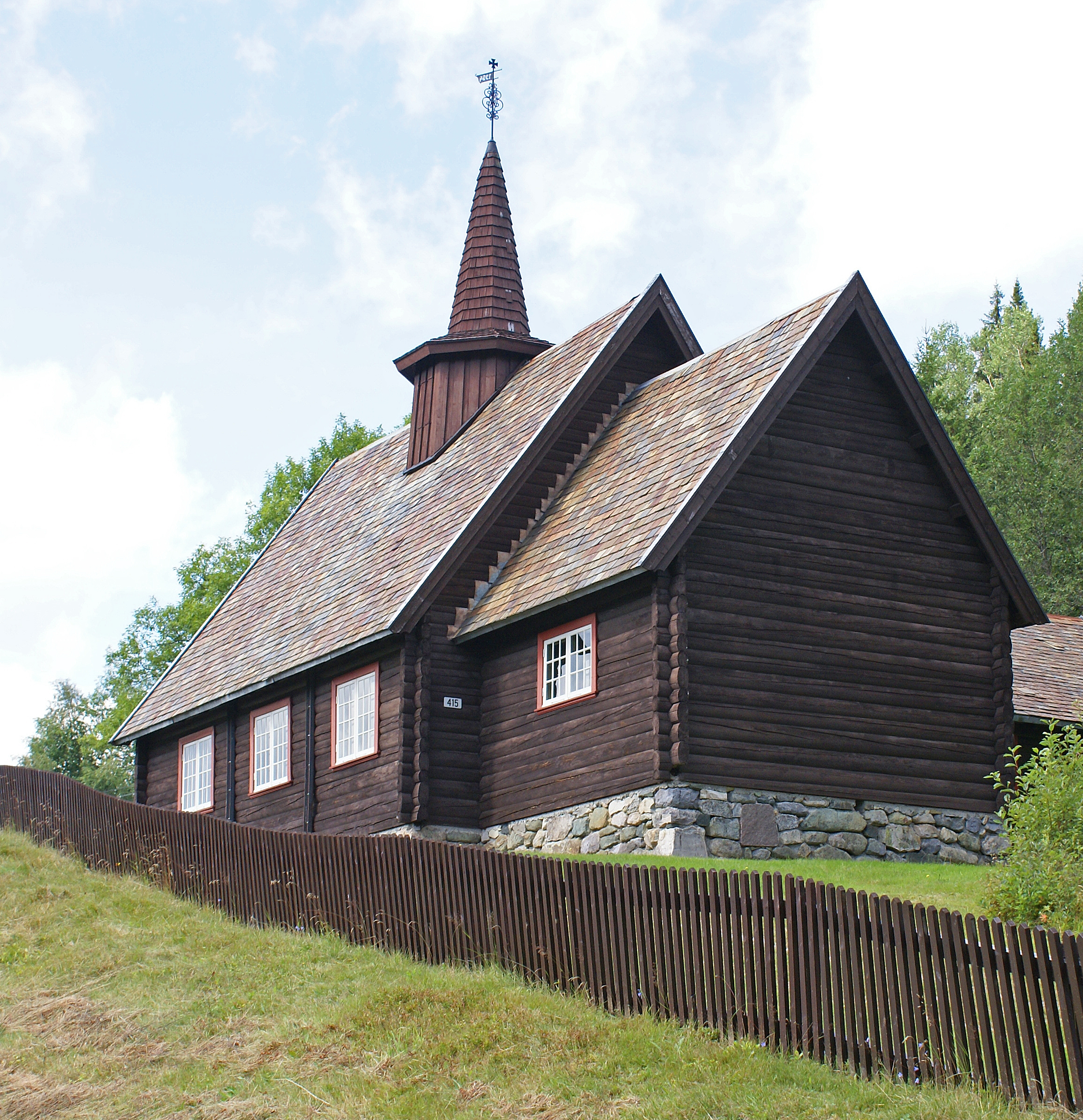
- View of the church
- Mandal Chapel
- 59°34′27″N 8°26′21″E
- Location: Seljord Municipality, Telemark
- Country: Norway
- Denomination: Church of Norway
- Churchmanship: Evangelical Lutheran

History
- Status: Parish church
- Founded: 1954
- Consecrated: 13 June 1954

Architecture
- Functional status: Active
- Architect: Wilhelm Swensen
- Architectural type: Long church
- Completed: 1954 (72 years ago)

Specifications
- Capacity: 100
- Materials: Wood

Administration
- Diocese: Agder og Telemark
- Deanery: Øvre Telemark prosti
- Parish: Seljord
- Norwegian Cultural Heritage Site
- Type: Church
- Status: Not protected
- ID: 84383

Mandal Chapel (Norwegian: Mandal kapell) is a parish church of the Church of Norway in Seljord Municipality in Telemark county, Norway. It is located in the village of Mandal. It is one of the churches for the Seljord parish which is part of the Øvre Telemark prosti (deanery) in the Diocese of Agder og Telemark. The brown, wooden church was built in a long church design in 1954 using plans drawn up by the architect Wilhelm Swensen. The church seats about 100 people.

== History ==
Mandal Chapel was built thanks to the emigrant Ole Bringen, who had settled in Nebraska and sent money back to his home village to be used for the construction of a chapel. The plot of land was given by a teacher named Kjetil Kvåle. The chapel was designed by Wilhelm Swensen and it was built in 1954. The new chapel was consecrated on 13 June 1954. The nave and chancel are both rectangular. There is a small tower on the roof of the nave. There is a church porch on the west end of the nave. In addition, a north wing with a meeting room was built. The choir can also be separated from the nave when the latter is used for other types of events. Around 2010, the roof was replaced.

== Media gallery ==
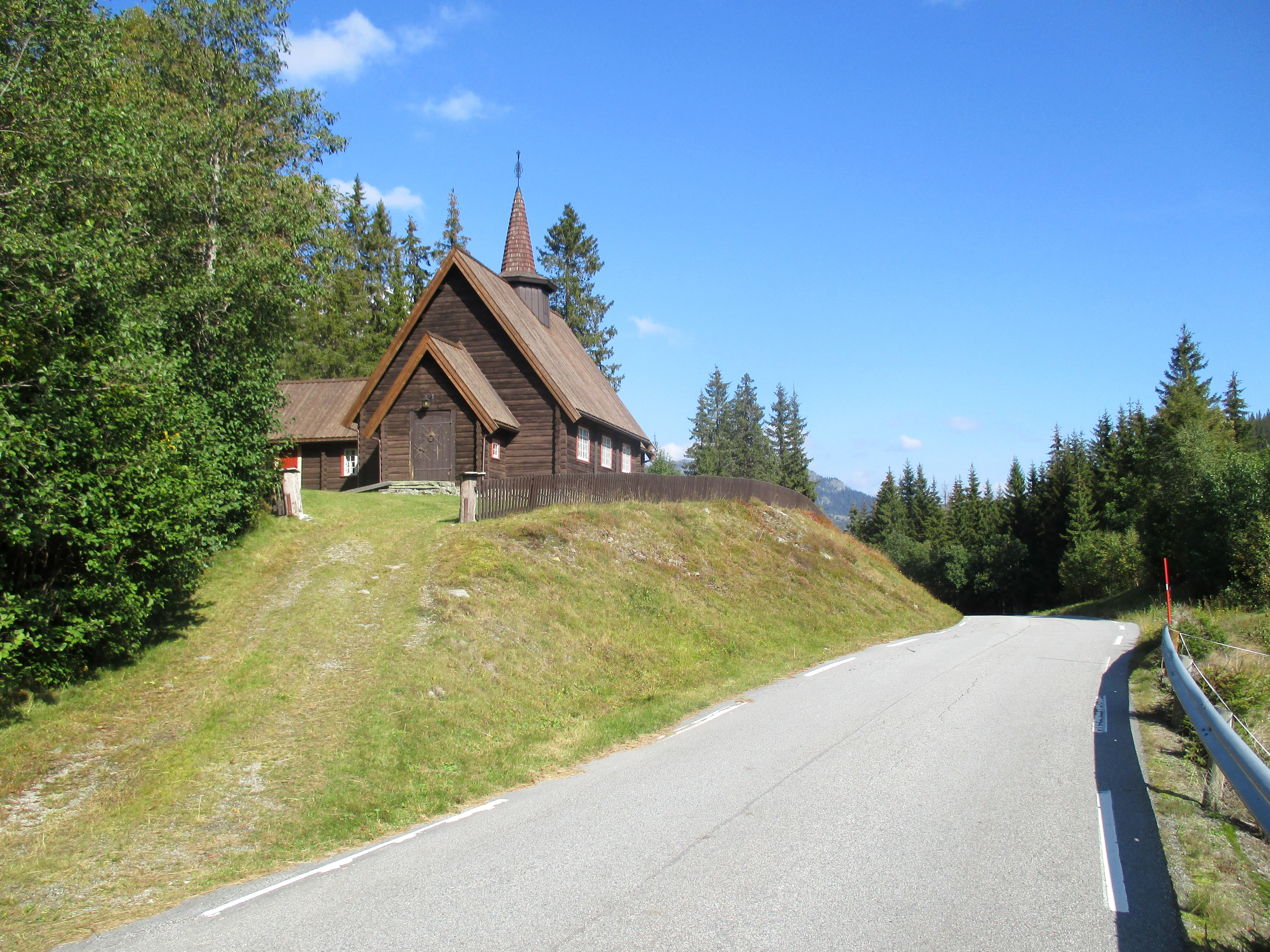

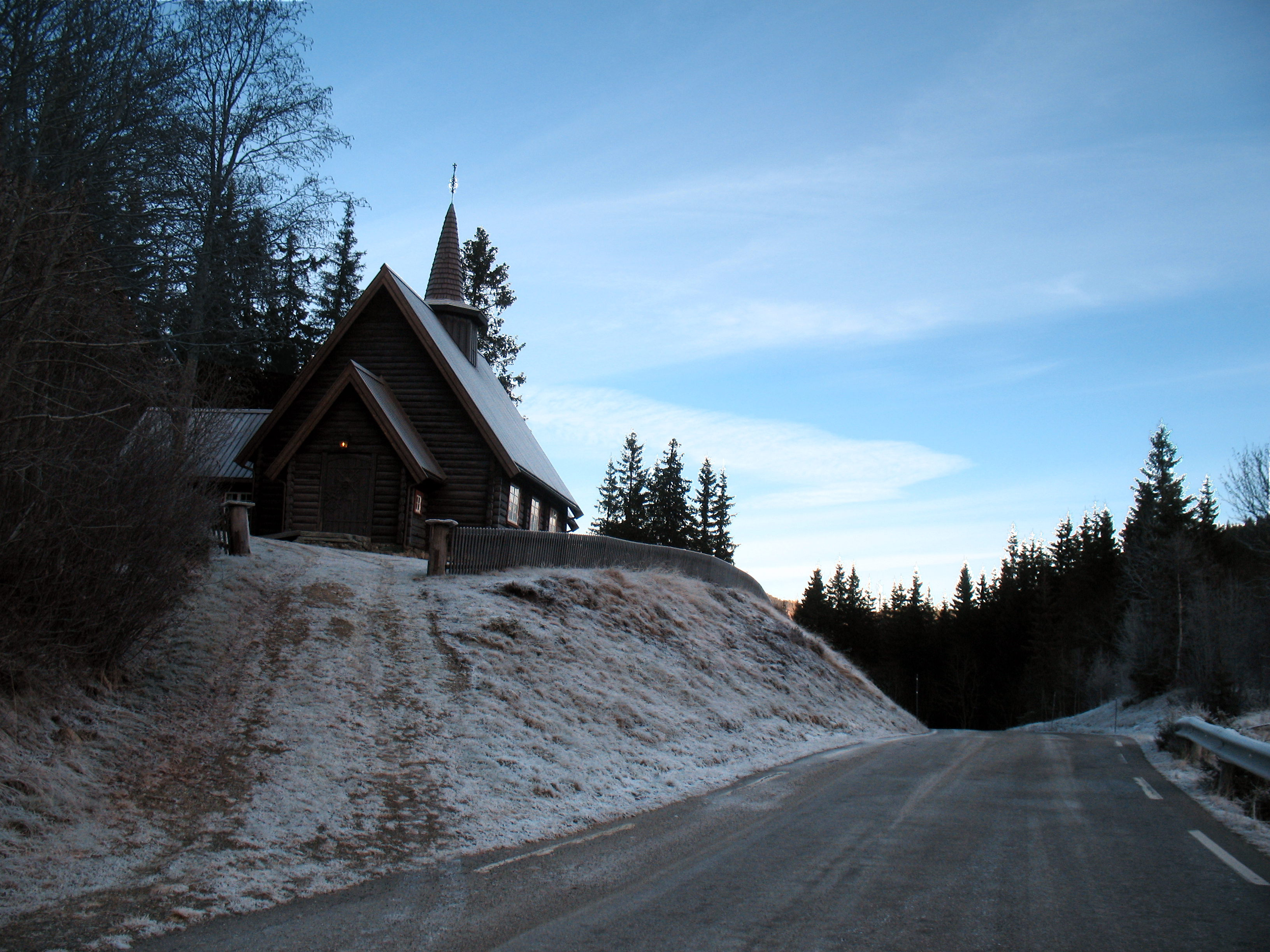

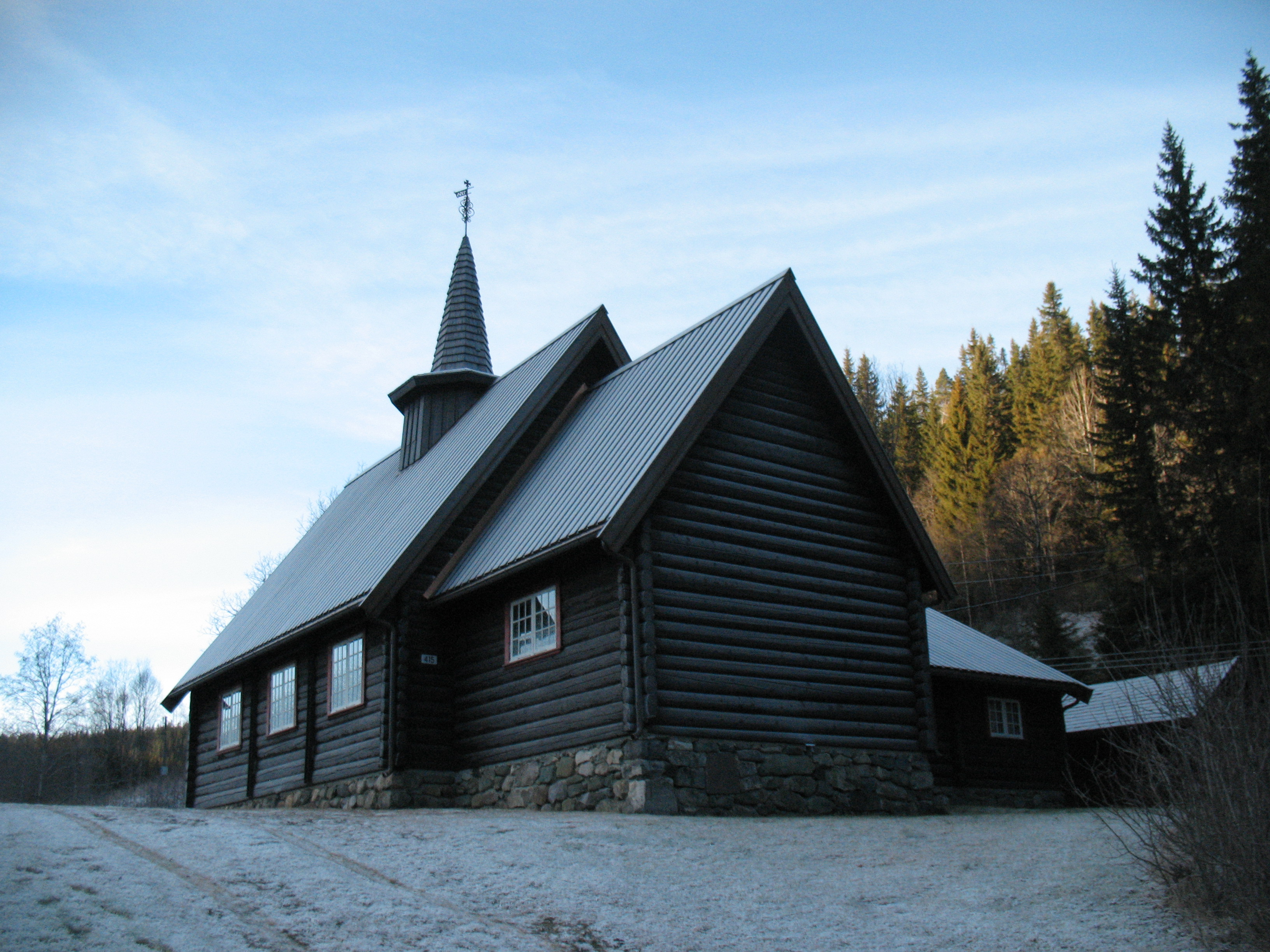

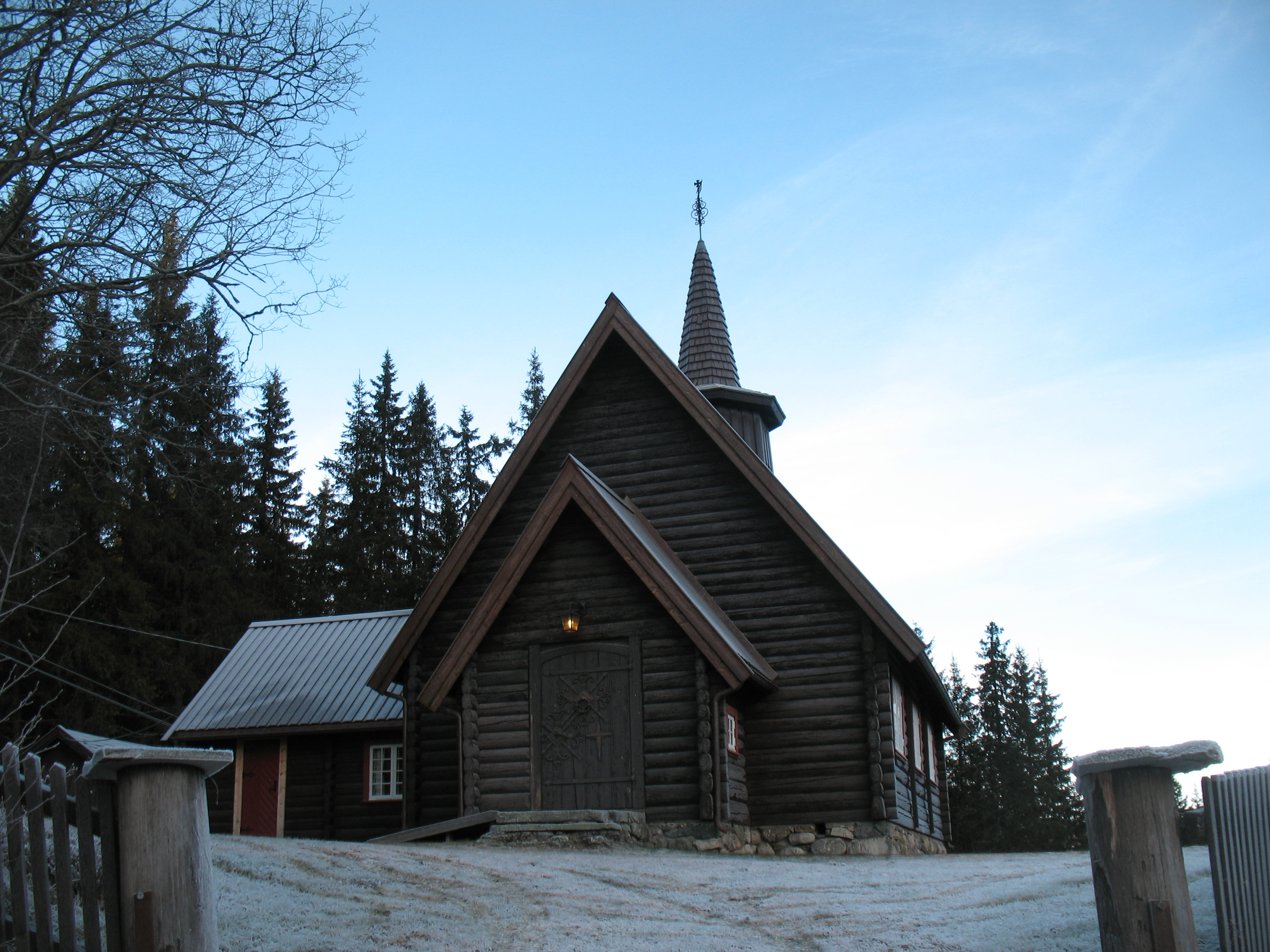

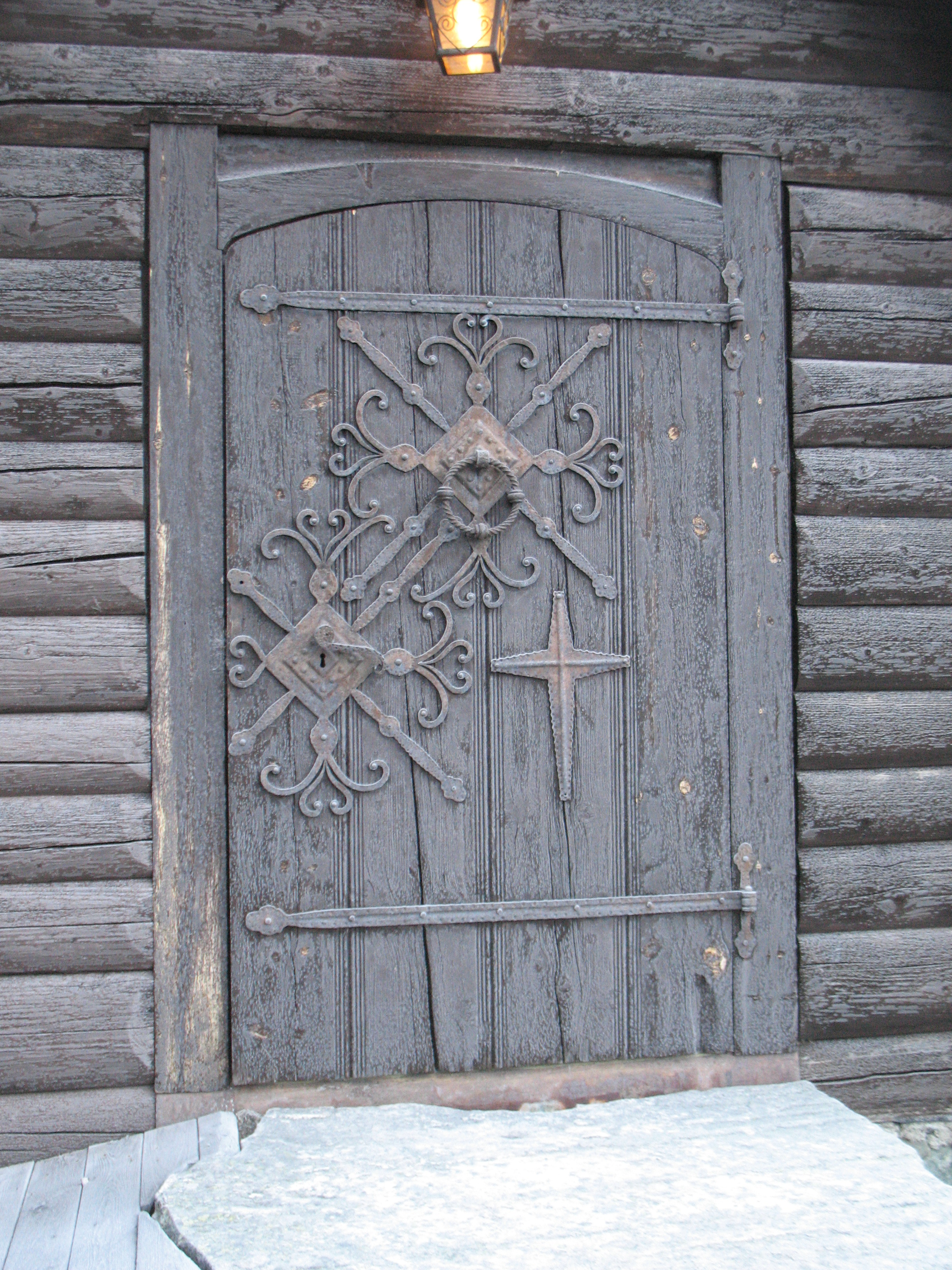

== See also ==
- List of churches in Agder og Telemark
