= Åmotsdal =

Village in Seljord Municipality, Norway

Åmotsdal Aamotsdal (historic)
- Village
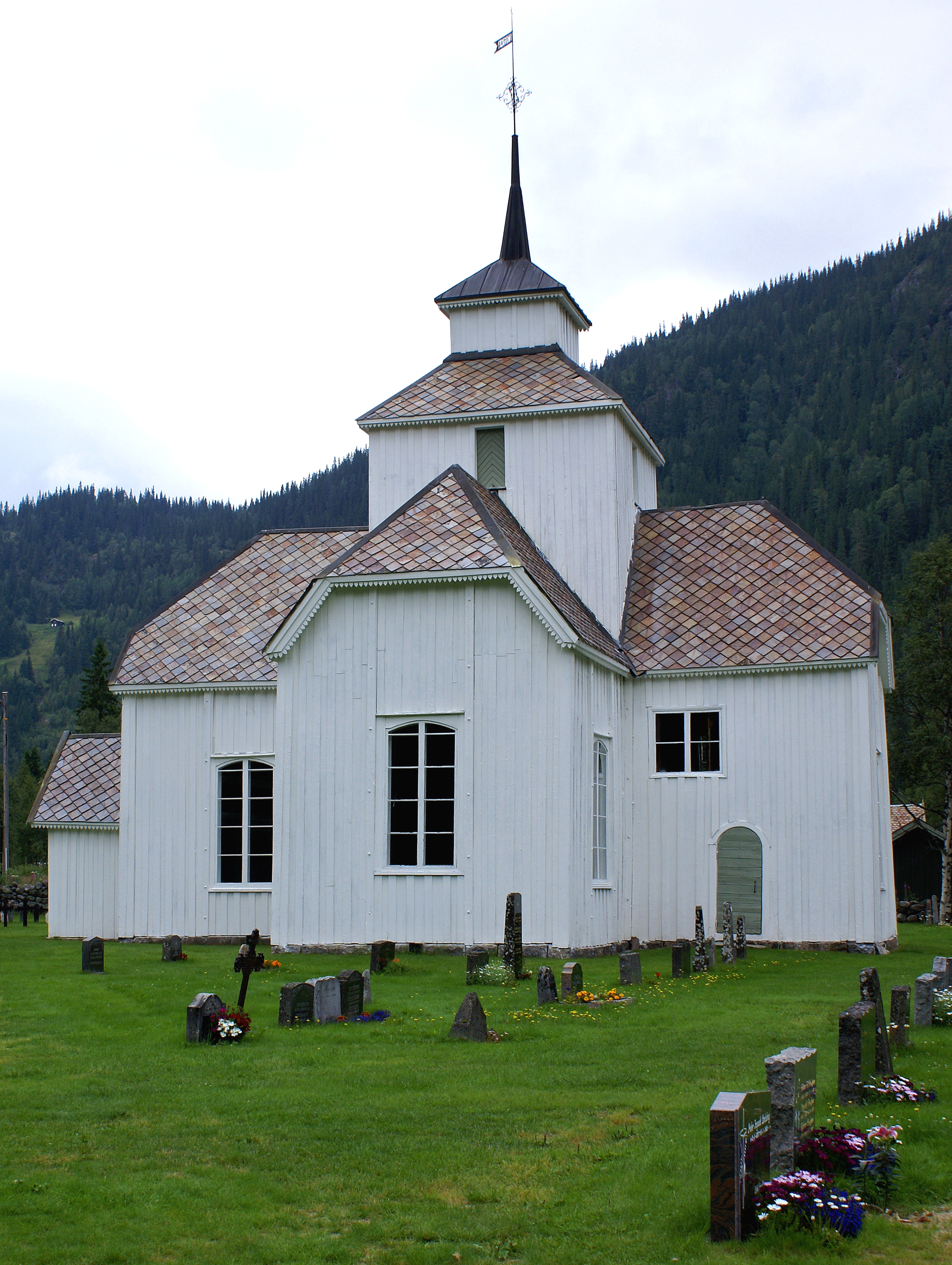
- View of the village church
- Interactive map of Åmotsdal
- Coordinates: 59.62981°N 8.40565°E
- Country: Norway
- Region: Eastern Norway
- County: Telemark
- District: Vest-Telemark
- Municipality: Seljord Municipality
- Elevation: 488 m (1,601 ft)
- Time zone: UTC+01:00 (CET)
  - Summer (DST): UTC+02:00 (CEST)
- Post Code: 3844 Åmotsdal

Åmotsdal is a valley and small rural village in Seljord Municipality in Telemark county, Norway. The villages is located about 25 kilometres (16 mi) to the northwest of the village of Seljord and about 12 kilometres (7.5 mi) to the northwest of the village of Flatdal. It is the site of Åmotsdal Church (Åmotsdal kyrkje) which was built in 1792.
