= Åmotsdal Church =

Church in Telemark, Norway

- Åmotsdal kyrkje
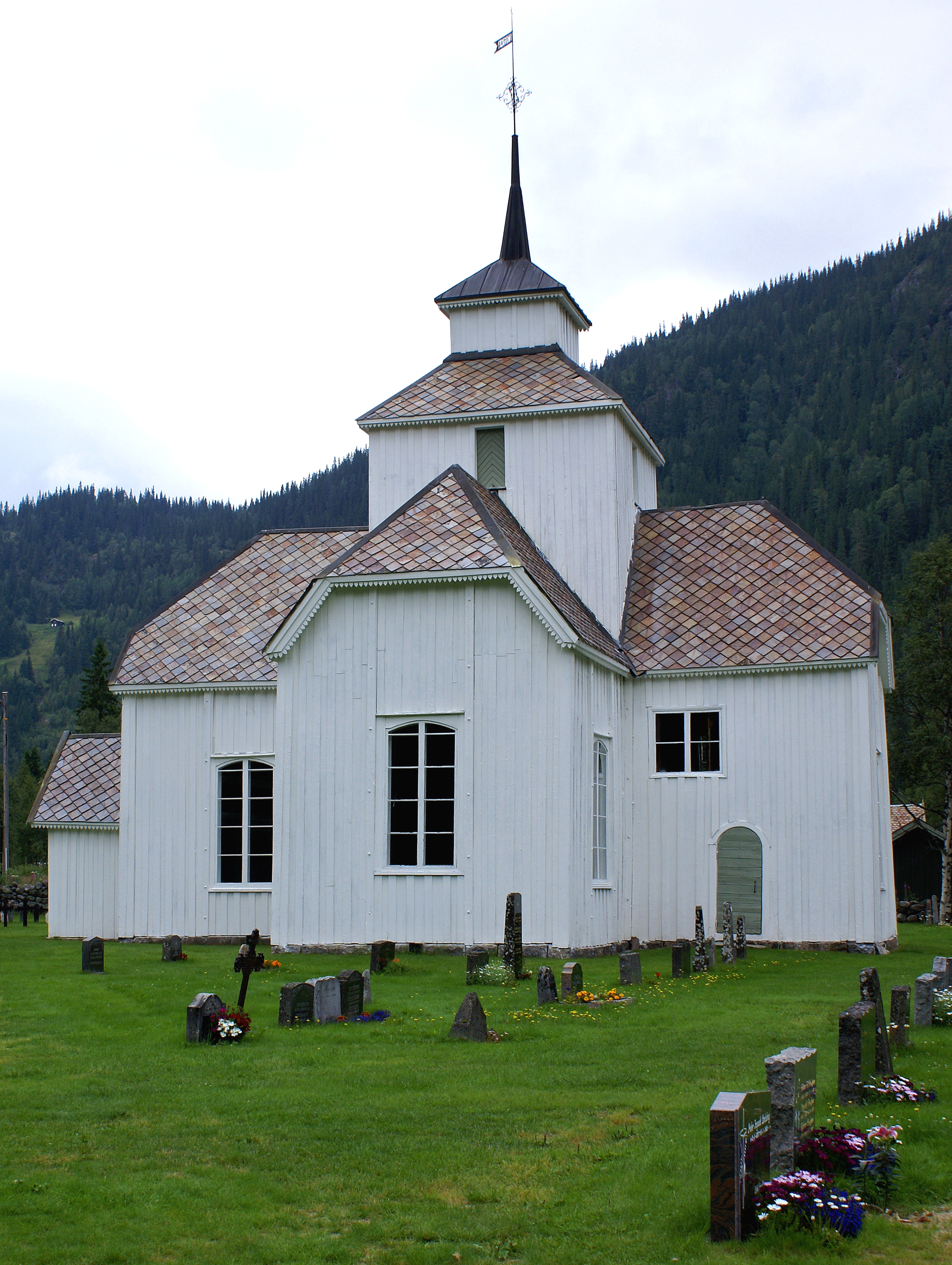
- View of the church
- Åmotsdal Church
- 59°37′39″N 8°24′26″E
- Location: Seljord Municipality, Telemark
- Country: Norway
- Denomination: Church of Norway
- Previous denomination: Catholic Church
- Churchmanship: Evangelical Lutheran

History
- Status: Parish church
- Founded: c. 13th century

Architecture
- Functional status: Active
- Architect: Jarand Rønjom
- Architectural type: Cruciform
- Completed: 1792 (234 years ago)

Specifications
- Capacity: 200
- Materials: Wood

Administration
- Diocese: Agder og Telemark
- Deanery: Øvre Telemark prosti
- Parish: Seljord
- Norwegian Cultural Heritage Site
- Type: Church
- Status: Automatically protected
- ID: 85970

Åmotsdal Church (Norwegian: Åmotsdal kyrkje) is a parish church of the Church of Norway in Seljord Municipality in Telemark county, Norway. It is located in the village of Åmotsdal. It is one of the churches for the Seljord parish which is part of the Øvre Telemark prosti (deanery) in the Diocese of Agder og Telemark. The white, wooden church was built in a cruciform design in 1792 using plans drawn up by the architect Jarand Aasmundson Rønjom. The church seats about 200 people.

== History ==
The earliest existing historical records of the church date back to the year 1468, but the church was not new that year. The first church in Åmotsdal was a wooden stave church that may have been built in the 13th century. The old church was built in the old style with open air corridors surrounding the building. Historically, the church was an annex chapel under the main Hjartdal Church and the priest would visit Åmotsdal Church about once every 4 or 5 weeks. In 1723, the church was sold into private ownership during the Norwegian church sale when the King sold the churches to pay off debts from the Great Northern War. The church fell into disrepair and the church was in need of significant repair or replacement. A major rebuilding took place in 1744, but it was only temporary. Around 1791, the old church was torn down and a new timber-framed cruciform building was built on the same site. Jarand Aasmundson Rønjom designed and built the new church. The new building was consecrated in 1792. The church has a pulpit altar which takes up most of the eastern transept, so the church essentially has a T-shape. There have been a few repairs and updates over the years, but the church has maintained the same design and appearance. In 1915, a second pulpit on the floor was installed. In 1959–1960, a church porch was added at the main entrance.

== Media gallery ==
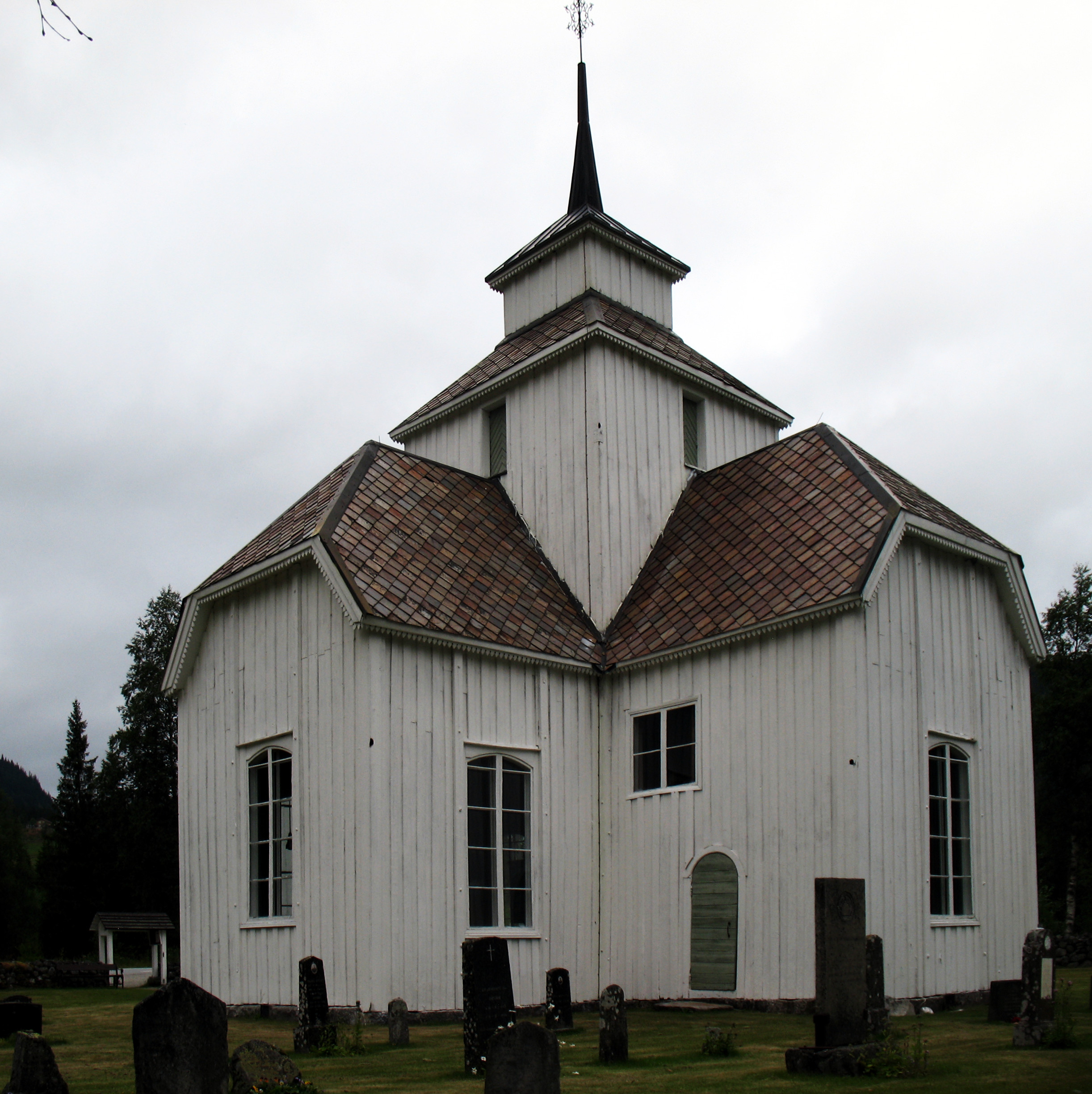

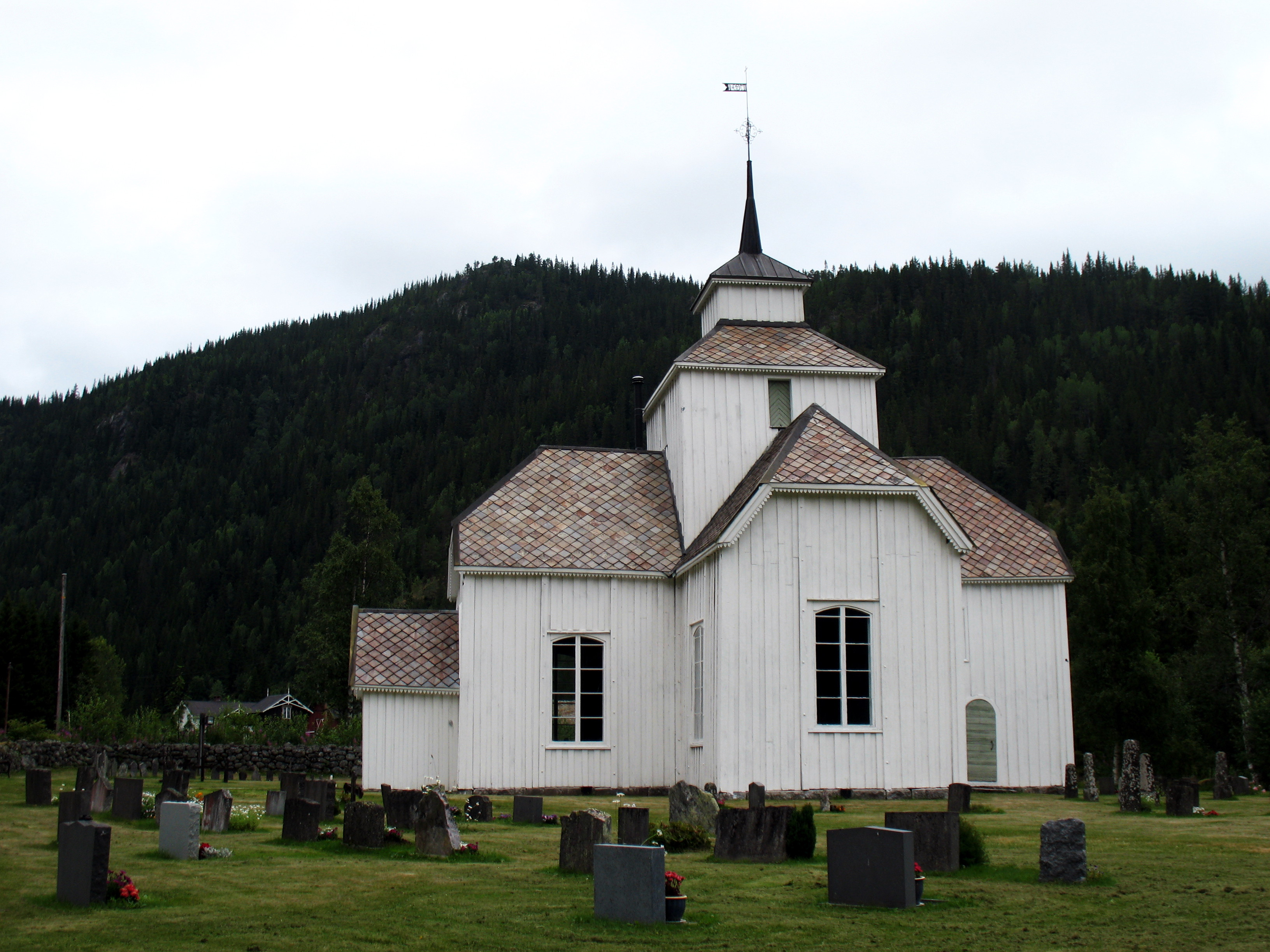

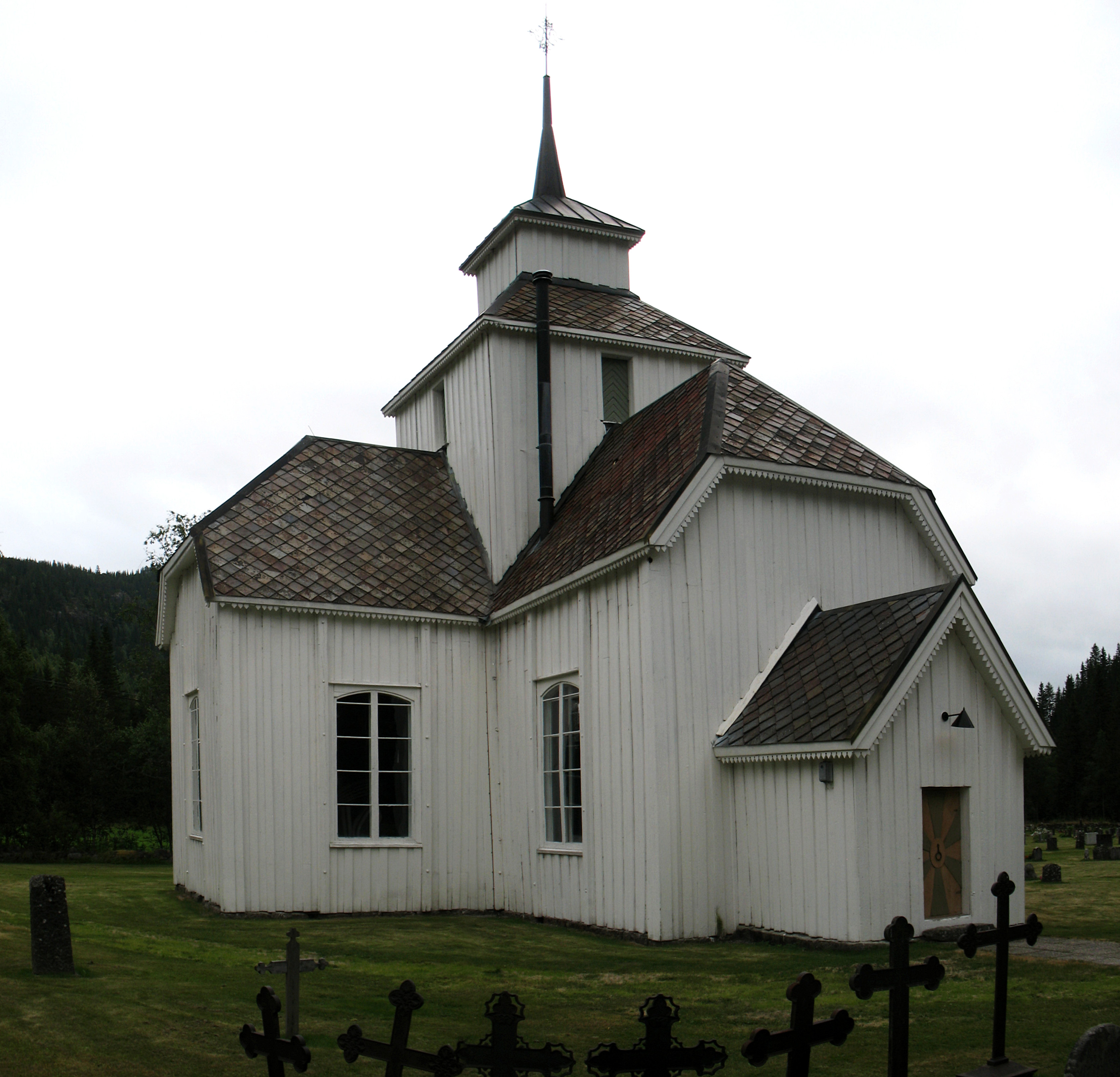

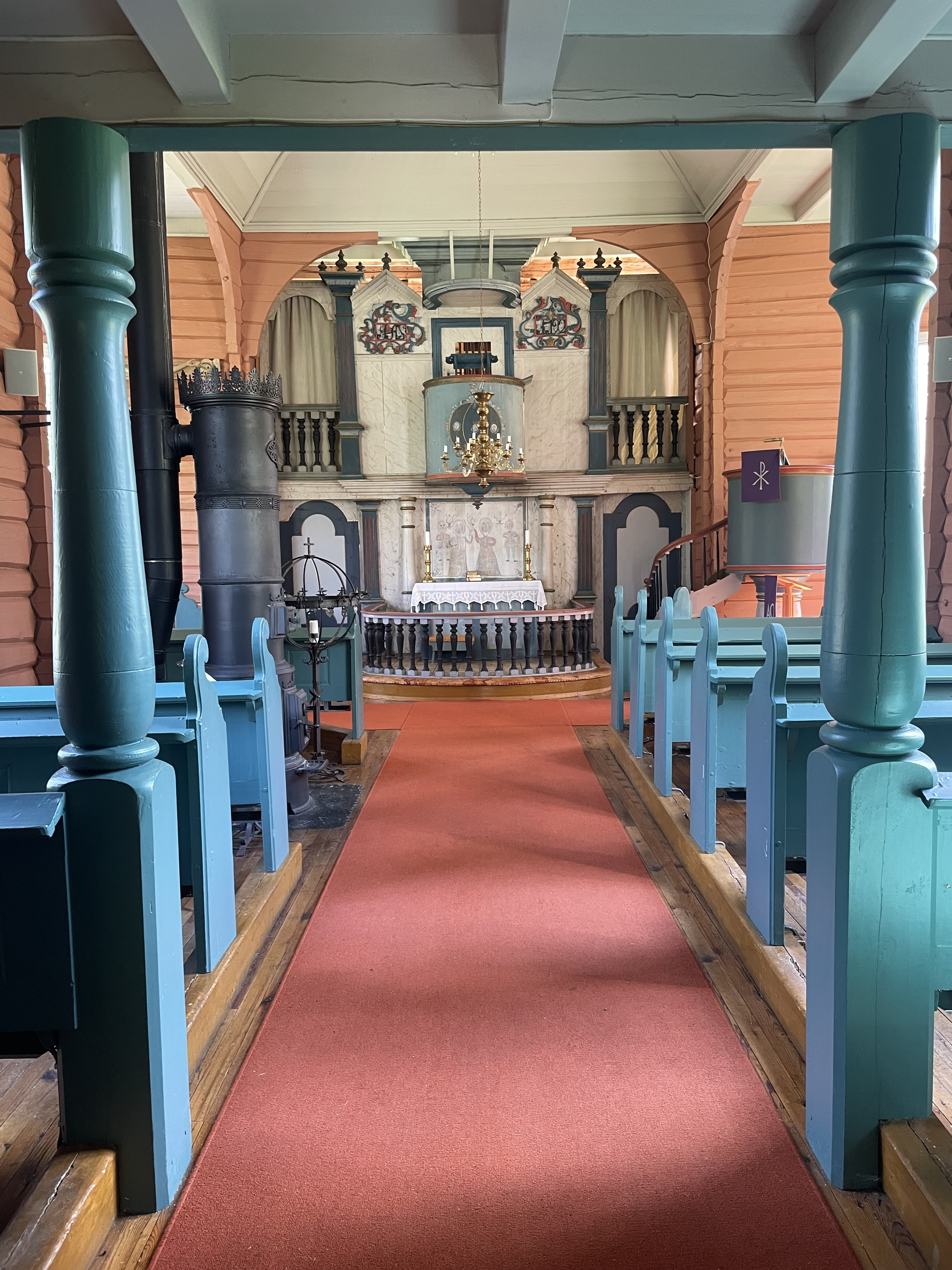

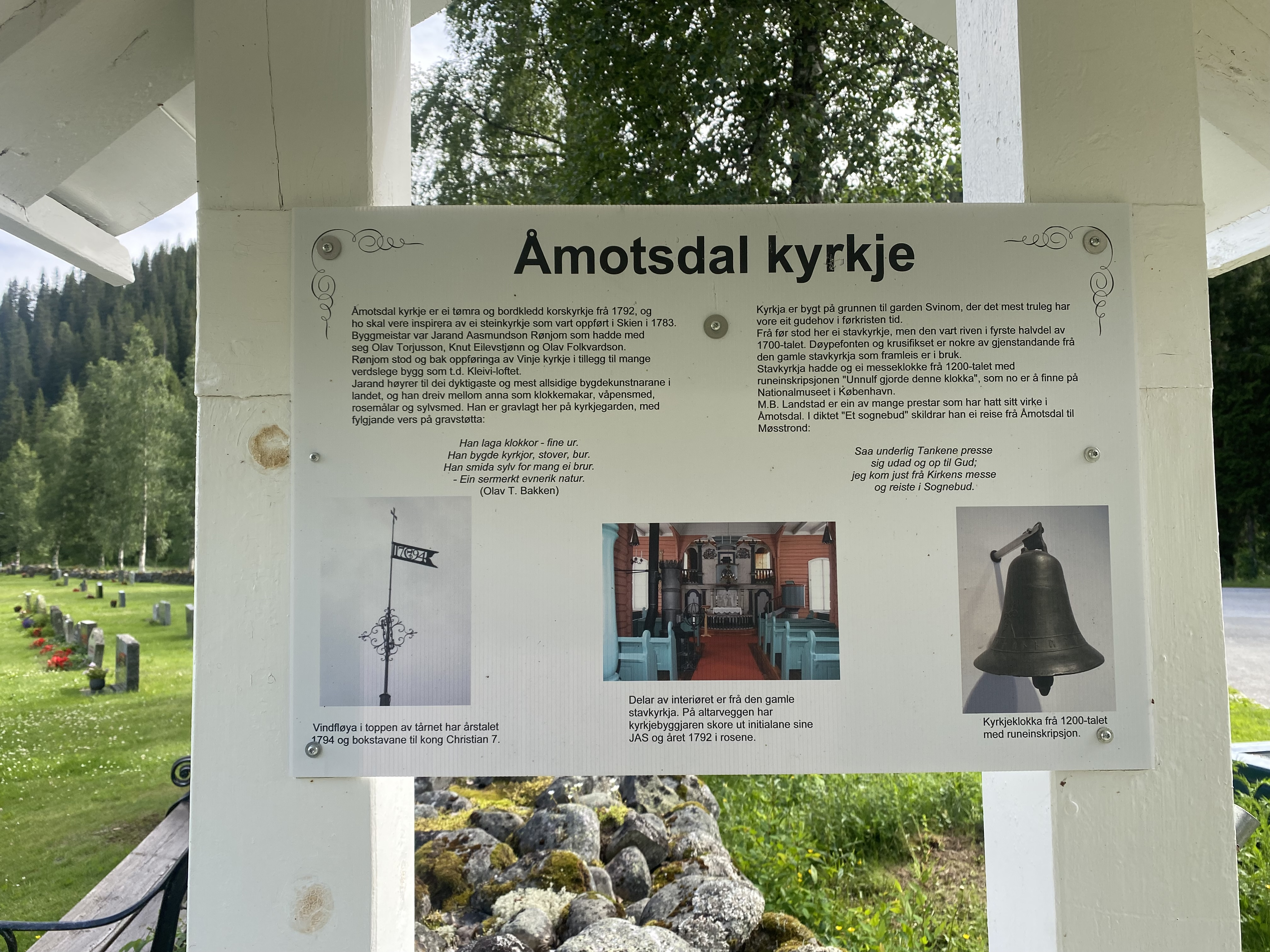

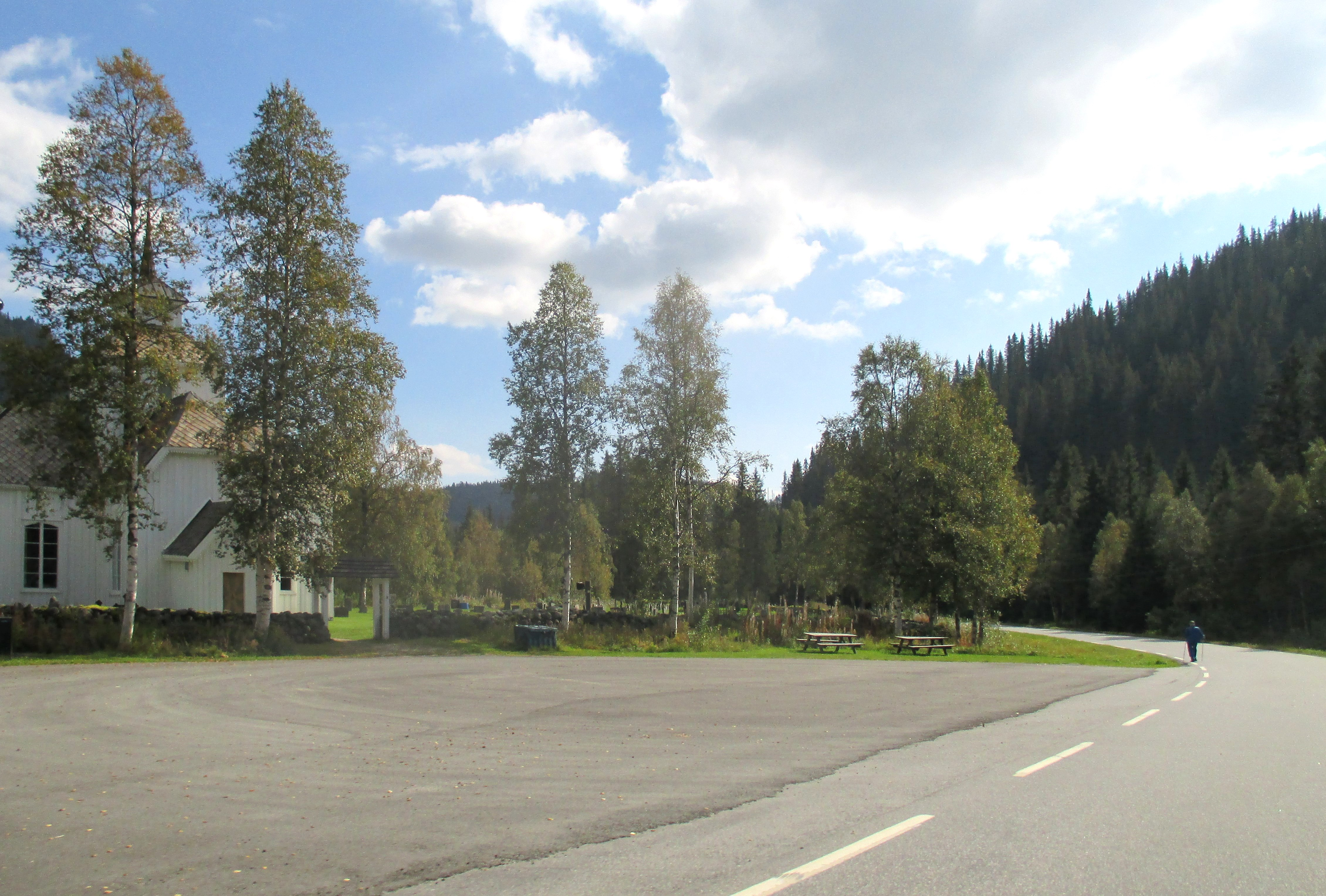

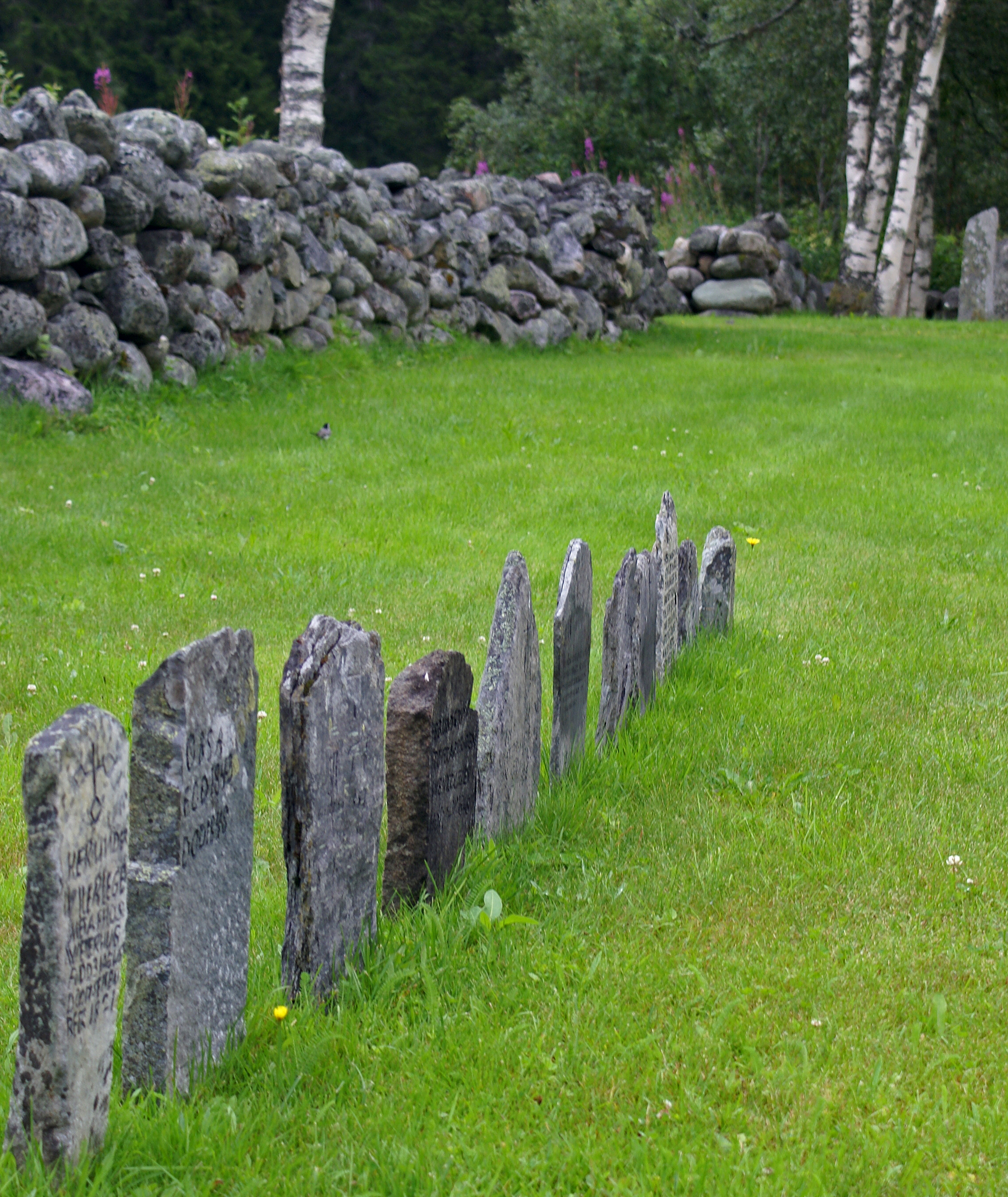

== See also ==
- List of churches in Agder og Telemark
