= Selma (lake monster) =

Norwegian lake monster

Selma depicted in the coat of arms of Seljord in Telemark

In Norwegian folklore, Selma (Norwegian: Seljordsormen, "the Seljord serpent") is a legendary sea serpent said to live in the 13-kilometre-long (8-mile) Lake Seljord (Seljordsvatnet) in Seljord Municipality, Telemark, Norway.

Selma's image was incorporated into the coat of arms of Seljord in 1989. Designed by sculptor Trygve Magnus Barstad, the creature is depicted in gold on a red background.

The sea serpent has been the subject of discussion since at least the 18th century. Eyewitness descriptions of encounters have tended to peak during hot, quiet summers. The oldest written account of the creature dates back to 1750, when it was said to have rounded a rowboat belonging to a man from Bø who was rowing across from Ulvenes to Nes.

== See also ==
- List of lake monsters
- Sea serpent
