= Helga Flatland =

Norwegian novelist and children's writer

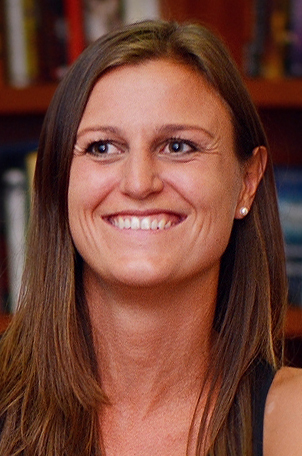
- Born: 16 September 1984 (age 41); Notodden, Norway
- Education: University of Oslo; Westerdals School of Communication
- Occupations: novelist and children's writer
- Relatives: Hallvard Flatland (uncle)
- Awards: Tarjei Vesaas' debutantpris (2010); Mads Wiel Nygaard's Endowment (2015); Norwegian Booksellers' Prize (2017)

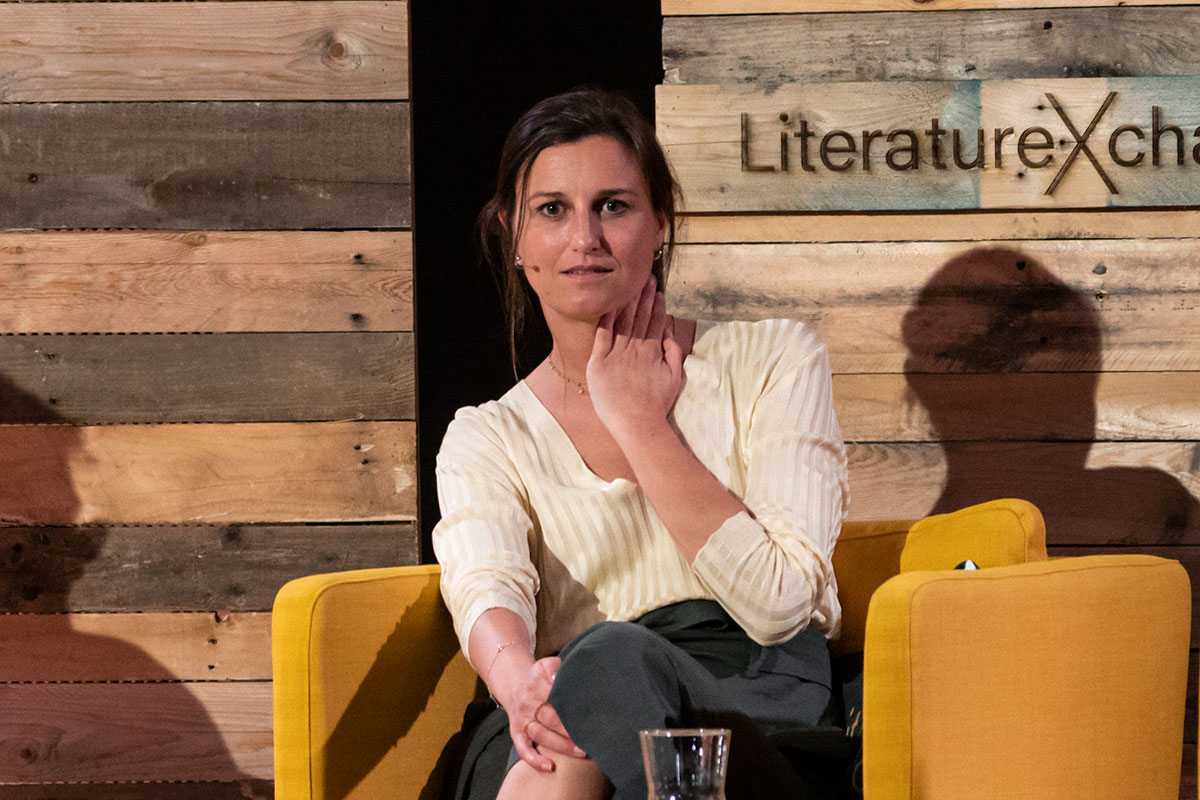
LiteratureXchange Festival, Aarhus/Denmark 2022

Helga Flatland (born 16 September 1984) is a Norwegian novelist and children's writer. Making her literary debut in 2010, she eventually became a full-time writer, and has won prizes such as Tarjei Vesaas' debutantpris, Mads Wiel Nygaard's Endowment and the Norwegian Booksellers' Prize.

== Early and personal life ==
Flatland was born in Notodden and grew up in Flatdal. She graduated in Scandinavian literature and language from the University of Oslo, and has also studied at Westerdals School of Communication. She worked with information advisory until she became a full-time writer.

== Literary career ==
Flatland made her literary debut in 2010 with the novel Bli hvis du kan. Reis hvis du må, for which she was awarded the Tarjei Vesaas' debutantpris. The novel was the first in a trilogy about "Tarjei", "Trygve" and "Kristian" who were recruited as soldiers to the war in Afghanistan, and was followed by Alle vil hjem. Ingen vil tilbake (2012) and Det finnes ingen helhet (2013).

In 2015 she released her first children's book, Eline får besøk, which was illustrated by Irene Marienborg. The sequel, Eline overnatter, was released in 2016. In 2015 Flatland was awarded the Amalie Skram Prize, and also Mads Wiel Nygaard's Endowment.

Her novel Vingebelastning treats themes such as self-realization and expectations of happiness. En moderne familie is about a family where the parents decide to divorce in their early 70s, and how this affects their grown-up children. An audiobook version is voiced by Jon Arne Arnseth, Anne Ryg and Anna Bache-Wiig. The novel earned Flatland the Norwegian Booksellers' Prize for 2017. In 2020 she released the novel Et liv forbi, which treats themes related to severe illness within a family. An audiobook version is voiced by Liv Bernhoft Osa and Ane Dahl Torp.

== Bibliography ==
=== Novels ===
- Bli hvis du kan. Reis hvis du må. Aschehoug. 2010.
- Alle vil hjem. Ingen vil tilbake. Aschehoug. 2012.
- Det finnes ingen helhet. Aschehoug. 2013.
- Vingebelastning. Aschehoug. 2016. ISBN 9788203361234.
- En moderne familie. Aschehoug. 2018. ISBN 9788203363245.
- Et liv forbi. Aschehoug. 2020. ISBN 9788203268601.
- Etterklang. 2022.
- Så gjør vi så. 2025.

=== Children's books ===
- Eline får besøk. Aschehoug. 2015. ISBN 9788203259364.
- Eline overnatter. Aschehoug. 2016. ISBN 9788203261978.

Awards
| Preceded by Eivind Hofstad Evjemo and Kjersti Annesdatter Skomsvold | Winner of Tarjei Vesaas' debutantpris 2010 | Succeeded by Lina Undrum Mariussen |
