= Jørund Telnes =

Norwegian farmer, teacher, writer and politician

- Born: 10 January 1845; Seljord Municipality, Norway
- Died: 3 February 1892 (aged 47)
- Occupations: farmer, teacher, writer and politician

Jørund Telnes (10 January 1845 – 3 February 1892) was a Norwegian farmer, teacher, writer and politician. Today he is most commonly associated with his book Soga om Sterke-Nils about no:Sterke-Nils (1722–1800), the legendary strongman from Telemark.

Telnes was born at Seljord Municipality in Telemark, Norway. He was the son of Nils Sigurdsson Forberg (1815–1874) and Ingebjørg Jørgensdotter Telnes (1825–1916). He was educated at the seminary in Kviteseid Municipality and later founded a folk high school. In 1874 he took over the Telnes farm (Telnes i Seljord herad). He served as mayor of Seljord from 1878 to 1884.

From a young age Telnes wrote poems. He debuted his published writing in 1877. Among his literary works was the poetry collection Kvæe from 1878 and the song collection Guro Heddelid which was based on a 14th-century myth.

== Selected works ==
- Soga om Sterke-Nils (1877)
- Kvæe (1878)
- Rupe-Ber (1878)
- Guro Heddelid (1880)
- Vetle Venehaug (1887)
- Netar (1890)
