= Terje Grøstad =

Norwegian painter and illustrator (1925–2011)

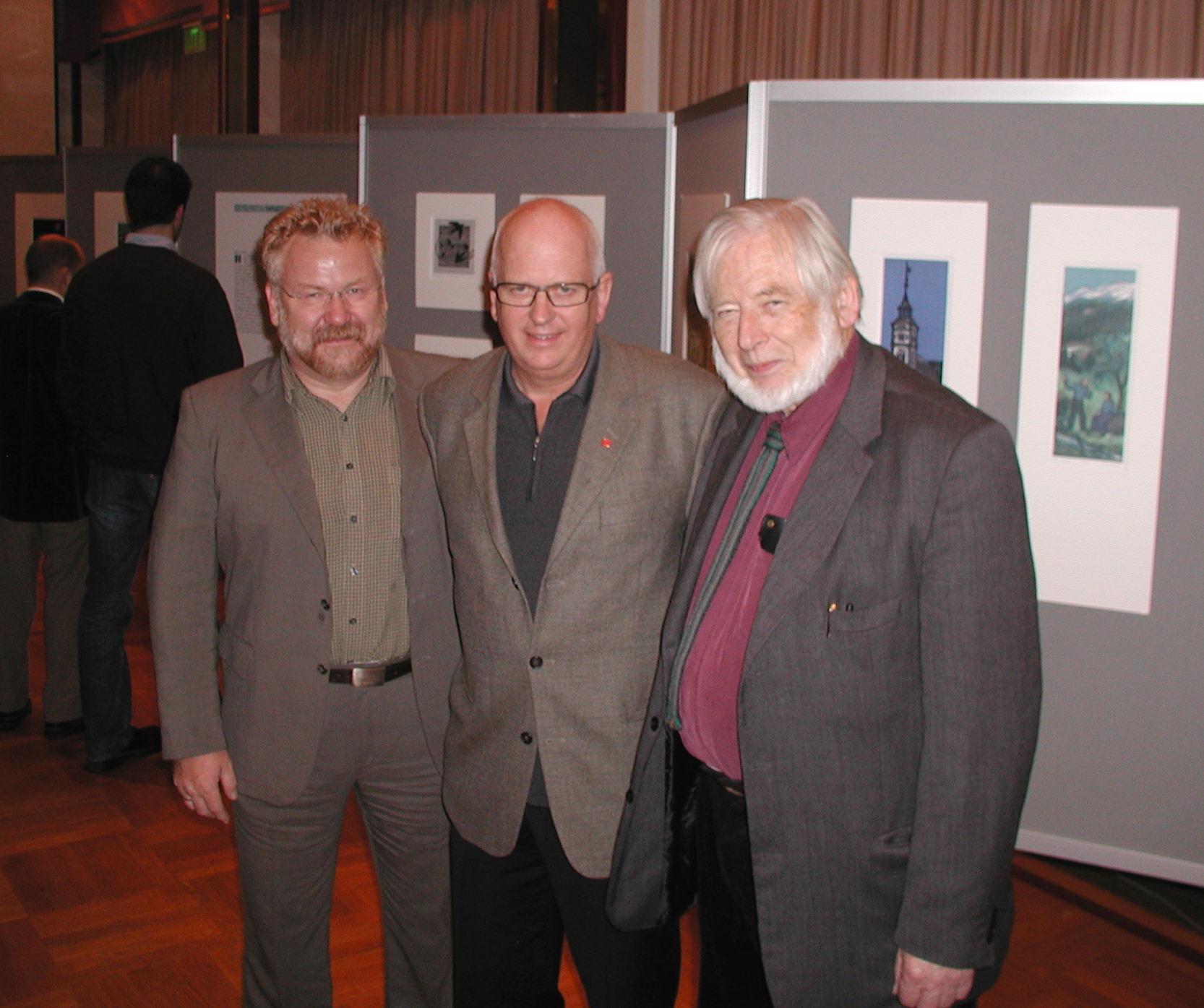
- Terje Grøstad (right) in 2005
- Born: 16 December 1925; Drammen. Norway
- Died: 10 July 2011 (aged 85); Flatdal, Norway
- Education: Norwegian National Academy of Fine Arts, Norwegian National Academy of Craft and Art Industry
- Known for: painting
- Awards: King's Medal of Merit in gold 1996

Terje Grøstad (16 December 1925 – 10 July 2011) was a Norwegian painter. graphic artist and illustrator.

== Biography ==
He was born in Drammen in Buskerud and lived in Flatdal in Telemark from the 1950s. He attended the Norwegian National Academy of Craft and Art Industry (1945) where he trained under Karl Høgberg. He was a student at the Norwegian National Academy of Fine Arts under Per Krohg (1947–50). He made his debut in 1948 at the Larvik Kunstforening.

He painted altarpieces in churches including at Havøysund Church and Tana Church and at Brevik Church.

Books illustrated by him (using woodcut technique) include Aust or Markom (1968 edition of Sven Moren's book from 1909), Dølen (1971–1972 reprint of Aasmund O. Vinje's magazine originally issued from 1858 to 1870), Den fjerde nattevakt (1972 edition of Johan Falkberget's novel) and Vann av klippen (2007, Eyvind Skeie).

His work is owned by the National Gallery of Norway and the National Museum of Fine Arts of Sweden. He was awarded the King's Medal of Merit in gold in 1996. He died in 2011.

== Other sources ==
- Arvid Møller (1995) Terje Grøstad Tresnitt 1950-1995 (Grøndahl og Dreyers Forlag) ISBN 82-504-2225-2
