= Hallvard Flatland =

Norwegian television presenter

Hallvard Flatland (born 10 February 1957 in Flatdal, Seljord Municipality), is a Norwegian television presenter. He is best known as a host on Norway's first commercial station, TVNorge, but has also worked for the Norwegian Broadcasting Corporation, TV 2 and TV3.

After his studies, Flatland began at the newspaper Trav og Galopp-Nytt in 1979. He worked as a journalist in the Norwegian Broadcasting Corporation from 1981 to 1986 and in TVNorge from 1988 to 1994. He created Norway's most popular gameshow, Casino, and presented it on TVNorge from 1989 to 1993 and on TV3 from 2003 to 2004. Flatland signed a contract at TVNorge in 1993 worth millions. He had great success as a presenter of the broadcasts from the 1994 Winter Olympics.

Flatland returned to TVNorge in September 2008 as presenter of the gameshow Power of 10. He also commentates on golf for Viasat.

He is married and has two children, including Katarina Flatland, presenter of Waschera on TV 2.

== Appearances ==
- Sportsquiz - TVNorge (1991)
- Casino - TVNorge (1989–1993), TV3 (2003–2006)
- Vindu mot Lillehammer - Norwegian Broadcasting Corporation (1994)
- Fredagsbørsen - TV 2 (1999)
- Ditt livs sjanse - Norwegian Broadcasting Corporation (2000)
- Experimentet - TV3
- Power of 10 - TVNorge (2008)

Awards
Preceded by Nils Gunnar Lie	Se og Hør's TV Personality of the Year; 1990	Succeeded by Helge Hammelow-Berg
