= Seljord (village) =

Village in Seljord Municipality, Norway

- Village
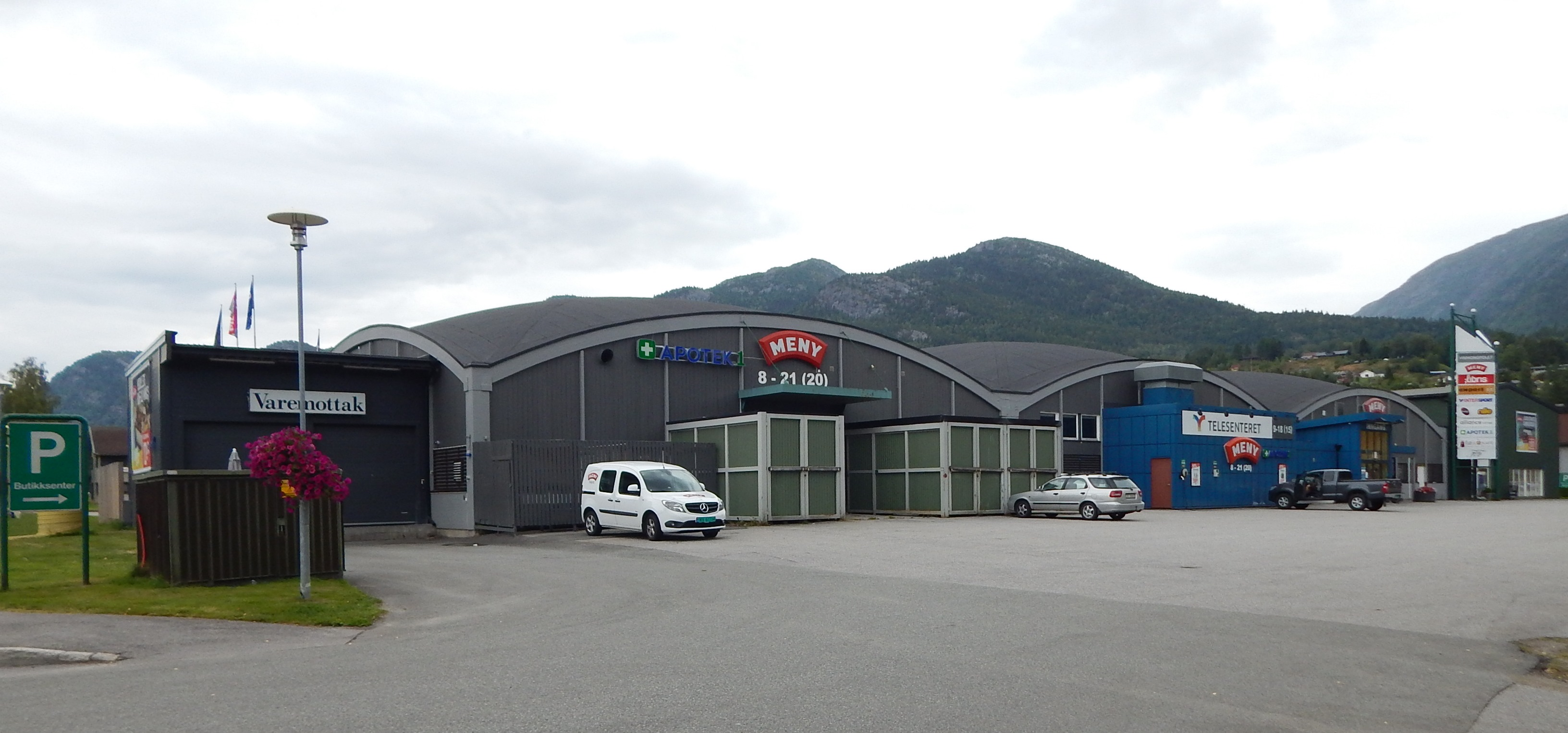
- View of the village business district
- Interactive map of Seljord
- Coordinates: 59.48477°N 8.63017°E
- Country: Norway
- Region: Eastern Norway
- County: Telemark
- District: Vest-Telemark
- Municipality: Seljord Municipality

Area
  - Total: 2.74 km^{2} (1.06 sq mi)
- Elevation: 126 m (413 ft)

Population (2025)
  - Total: 1,483
  - Density: 541/km^{2} (1,400/sq mi)
- Time zone: UTC+01:00 (CET)
  - Summer (DST): UTC+02:00 (CEST)
- Post Code: 3840 Seljord

Seljord is the administrative centre of Seljord Municipality in Telemark county, Norway. The village is located along the European route E134 highway, on the north end of the lake Seljordsvatn. It is located about 12 kilometres (7.5 mi) to the northeast of Kviteseidbyen, about 12 kilometres (7.5 mi) south of Flatdal, and about 25 kilometres (16 mi) southeast of Åmotsdal.

The 2.74-square-kilometre (680-acre) village has a population (2025) of 1,483 and a population density of 541 inhabitants per square kilometre (1,400/sq mi).

The Mælefjell Tunnel is located just a short distance north of the village. Seljord Church is also located in the village. The village is also the site of the Seljord folk high school, one of three of these schools in Telemark.
