= Magnus Brostrup Landstad =

Norwegian priest (1802–1880)

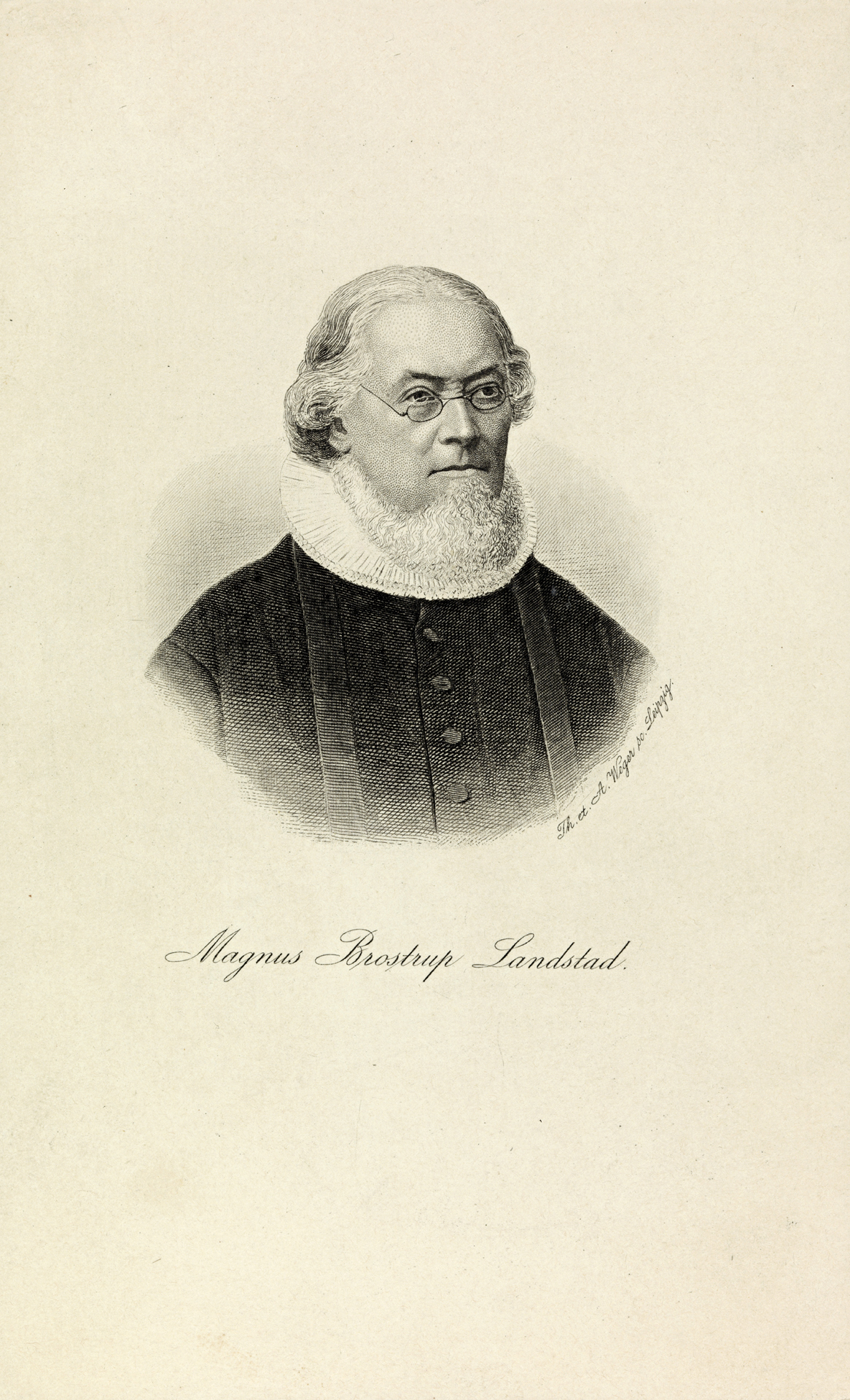
Portrait of Magnus Brostrup Landstad

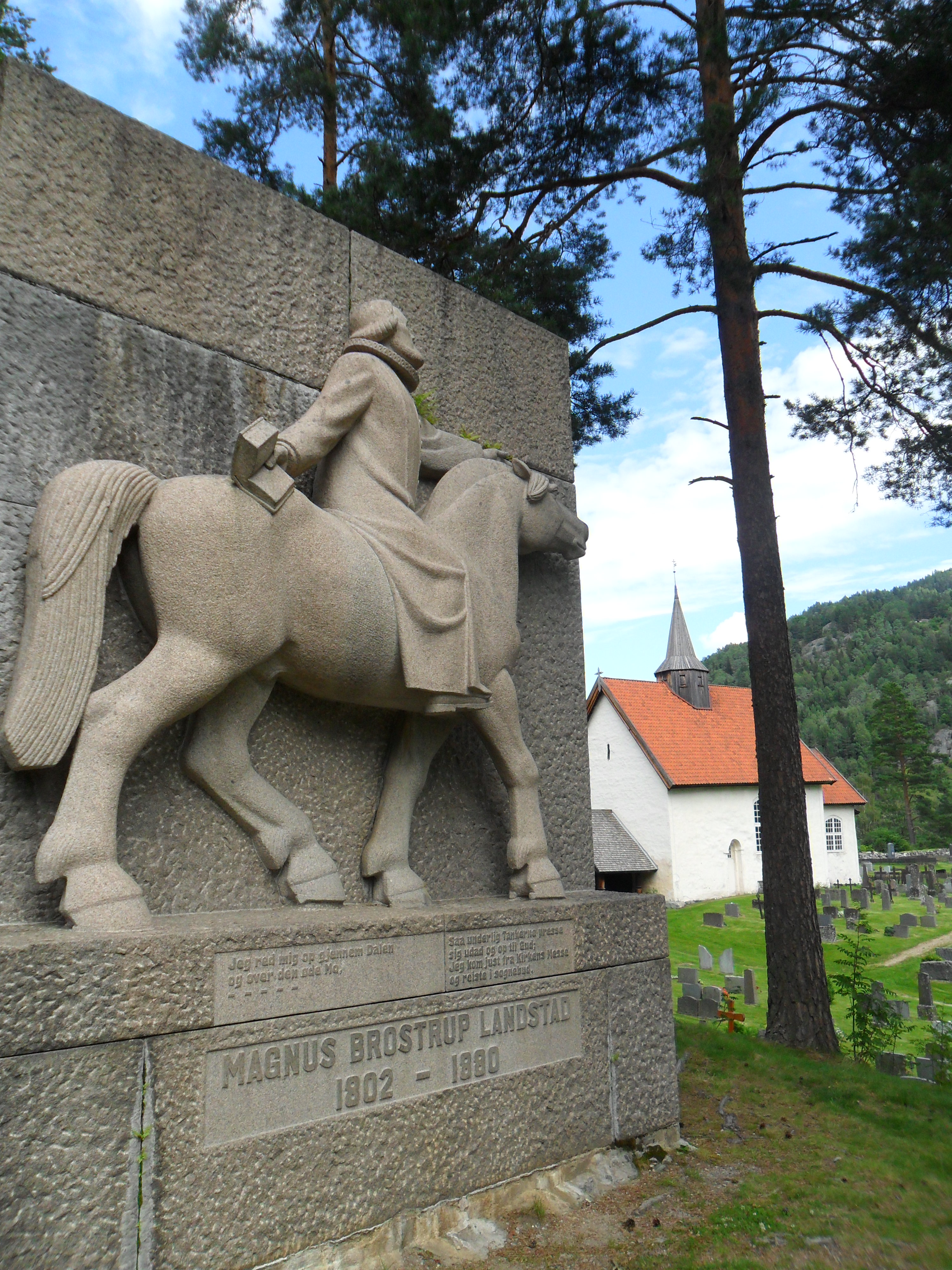
Memorial to Magnus Landstad at Seljord

Magnus Brostrup Landstad (7 October 1802 – 8 October 1880) was a Norwegian Lutheran parish priest and provost, hymn writer, and poet who published the first collection of authentic Norwegian traditional ballads in 1853.

== Biography ==
Landstad was born in the village of Måsøy in Finnmark, Norway. He was one of ten children born to the parish priest Hans Landstad (1771–1838) and Margrethe Elisabeth Schnitler (1768–1850). His father was a minister, who first worked at Øksnes Church in 1806, then relocated to Vinje Church in 1811 and to Seljord Church in 1819. His grandfather was Peter Schnitler (1690–1751). He was a cousin of the priest and local historian Hans Peter Schnitler Krag (1794–1855).

Landstad received a theology degree (cand.theol.) in 1827, and worked after that as the resident chaplain in Gausdal for six years. After that he worked in various parishes in Bratsberg and Smaalenenes counties before he became the minister at Sandar Church in Jarlsberg og Larvik county in 1859.

He is well known for introducing popular, contemporary Norwegian language into the hymns he wrote, contributing significantly to the spirit of Norwegian romantic nationalism, which grew in Norway during this period. Although criticized at the time for the use of unscientific methods, today it is commonly accepted that he contributed significantly to the preservation of traditional ballads.

His single greatest achievement was the Landstad hymnal (Landstads kirkesalmebog). He included about 50 of his own hymns in it and completed the editing in 1861. Later revisions were used in Norwegian (bokmål) parishes until 1985. The current official church hymnal contains a number of his hymns as well as his translations of foreign-language hymns.

== Personal life ==
He married Wilhelmine Margrete Marie Lassen (1808–1892) in 1828. They were the parents of twelve children, of whom six died in early childhood. He died in 1880 at Kristiania (now Oslo) and was buried at Vår Frelsers gravlund.

== Publications ==
- 1852: Norske Folkeviser. 3 vols. Christiania: C. Tönsberg, [1852–]1853.
- 1869: Kirkesalmebok: efter offentlig Foranstaltning. Kristiania: J. W. Cappelens Forlag, 1871
