= Carl Olson =

Carl or Karl Olson or Olsen may refer to:

- Bobo Olson (Carl Olson, 1928–2002), American boxer
- Carl Olson (drag racer), American Top Fuel drag racer
- Carl E. Olson (born 1969), American Catholic author
- Carl G. Olson (1904-1965), American farmer and politician
- Carl Marcus Olson (1911–2011), credited as the discoverer of the process to make silicon pure
- Karl Olson (1930–2010), American baseball player
- Carl Olsen (cyclist) (1893–1968), Norwegian Olympic cyclist
- Carl B. Olsen (1904–1998), American admiral
- Carl Gustav Sparre Olsen (1903–1984), Norwegian violinist and composer
- Karl Olsen (1910–1999), Norwegian civil servant

== See also ==
- Carl Olsson (disambiguation)
