= Harald Kihle =

Norwegian painter and illustrator

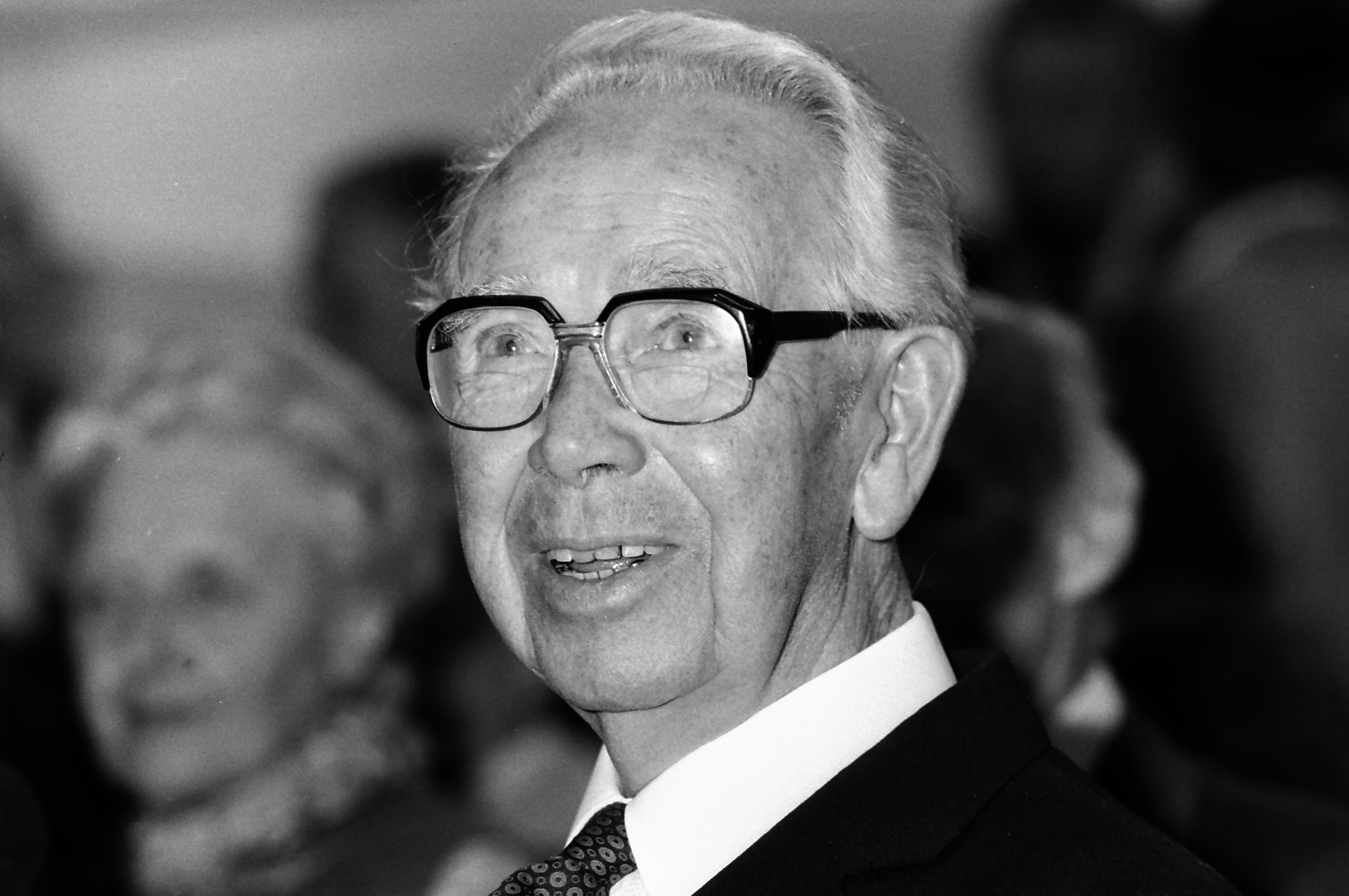
- Kihle in 1986
- Born: 3 July 1905; Horten, Norway
- Died: 2 August 1997 (aged 92)
- Occupations: painter and illustrator

Harald Kihle (3 July 1905 – 2 August 1997) was a Norwegian painter and illustrator. He is particularly known for his pictures with motifs from Telemark.

== Personal life ==
Kihle was born in Horten; the son of Anton Jørgensen and Mina Gunelia Halvorsdatter Leikås. In 1930 he married Ingrid Kirsten Olsen. From the 1950s the family settled in the artists' community at Ekely in Oslo. He died in Oslo in 1997, 92 years old.

== Career ==
Kihle studied at the Statens håndverks- og kunstindustriskole from 1926 to 1929, and later with Henrik Sørensen, Axel Revold, Per Krohg and Marcel Gromaire. He is particularly known for his motifs from Telemark. He was fascinated by the nature and folk culture of Telemark, arts, crafts, songs and music, and the farmers' way of life. The horse became a key motif for Kihle, and in his pictures he stuck to the ancient Telemark before the introduction of tractors and electric power lines. He spent many summers in Hjartdal, Flatdal, Dyrlandsdalen, Svartdal, Arabygdi, and in his later years in the rural village Smørklepp in Vinje Municipality, below the mountain Ormeggene. In 1947 he built a summerhouse at the farm Negarden in Smørklepp, and spent many summers there with his wife. He worked together with fellow painter Henrik Sørensen, who also spent summers at Smørklepp. In 1961 he wrote an article about his thirty summers in Telemark until then, printed in the annual Årbok for Telemark. The gallery Vinje Biletgalleri at Smørklepp contains a number of works by Kihle and Sørensen. In Telemark Kihle found inspiration from the nature of the valley Botnedalen in Mo Municipality, including the mountain farm Ripilen, and was a frequent guest at the Mo Vicarage. He was inspired by the legends of "Storegut" and "Guro Heddelid". He painted Storegutdrapet (The killing of Storegut) in 1943-1944, and illustrated a 1951 edition of Vinje's cycle of poems Storegut. The legend is based on an event that took place in 1791, the killing of the strongman "Storegut". Among Kihle's paintings are En jordferd (A funeral) from 1936, Anne from 1939, Fra Telemark from 1953, Oktobersnø over Ormeggene from 1955 and Guro rid til ottesong (Guro rides to matins) (1957–1960), all in the National Gallery of Norway. His painting Tømmerkjøring (Log driving) from 1950 is located at the Norwegian Ministry of Foreign Affairs. Among his book illustrations are woodcuts for Vinje's Storegut, Tarjei Vesaas' novel Det store spelet (The great game), and Jørund Telnes' song collection Guro Heddelid. He painted altarpieces for the Grunge Church in Vinje and the Bakkebø Chapel in Egersund. He took part in the restoration of an ancient altarpiece which had originally belonged to a demolished stave church in Mo, which he decorated jointly with Henrik Sørensen, and afterwards was installed in Mo Church.

From the early 1930s Kihle typically used earthen colors and a primitive painting style. Later his paintings became brighter and the style more sophisticated.
