= Talleiv Huvestad =

Farmer, father of the Constitution of Norway

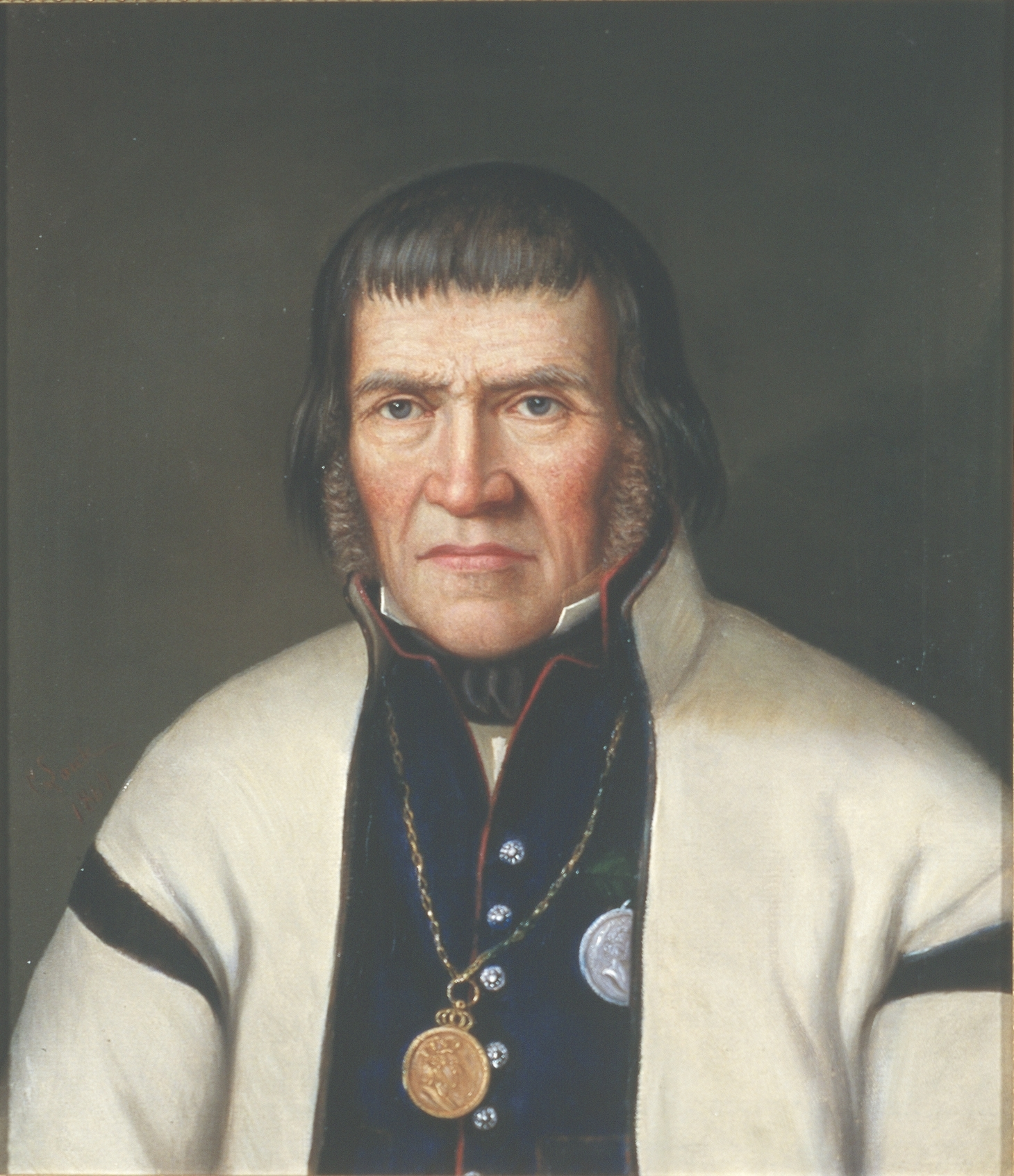
- Talleiv Olavson Huvestad by C. Lorch. From DigitaltMuseum
- Born: 1761; Skafså, Norway
- Died: 13 July 1847 (aged 85–86)
- Occupations: teacher, farmer and politician

Talleiv Olavson Huvestad (1761 – 13 July 1847) was a Norwegian teacher, farmer and politician.

Talleiv Olavson Huvestad was born on the Storaasli farm in the Skafså Church parish in the Mo prestegjeld in Øvre Telemark, Norway (now part of Tokke Municipality). He was the son of Olaf Tollefsson Storaasli (1724-1778) and Torbjør Gjermundsdotter Kjestveit (1734-1805). When his father died in his youth, he and his mother moved to the Eidsborg Church parish in the Laardal prestegjeld in Vest-Telemark where his mother married Vetle Huvestad. In 1794 he took over the Huvestad farm and on 7 November 1797 married Gjertud Rasmusdotter Mandt (1778-1845). They had 8 children. Besides farming, he served as a part-time teacher in rural Telemark villages. He acquired a special knowledge of health and justice and taught other farmers who sent their sons to him for training. He became deputy chairman of the village, and helped organize legal documents for other farmers. With his acquired health care skills, he served as both veterinarian and general practitioner. When vaccine was banned in 1810, most towns were affected, but Talleiv Huvestad's valley was vaccinated.

He was elected 2nd representative from Bratsberg County to the Storting in 1818 (and in 1821 & 1824) promoting a strong agriculture initiative.

Talleiv Huvestad was selected to represent Bratsberg amt at the Norwegian Constituent Assembly at Eidsvoll Manor in 1814, along with Severin Løvenskiold and Peder Jørgen Cloumann. He was a member of the coronation journey to Stockholm of King Carl Johan in 1818.

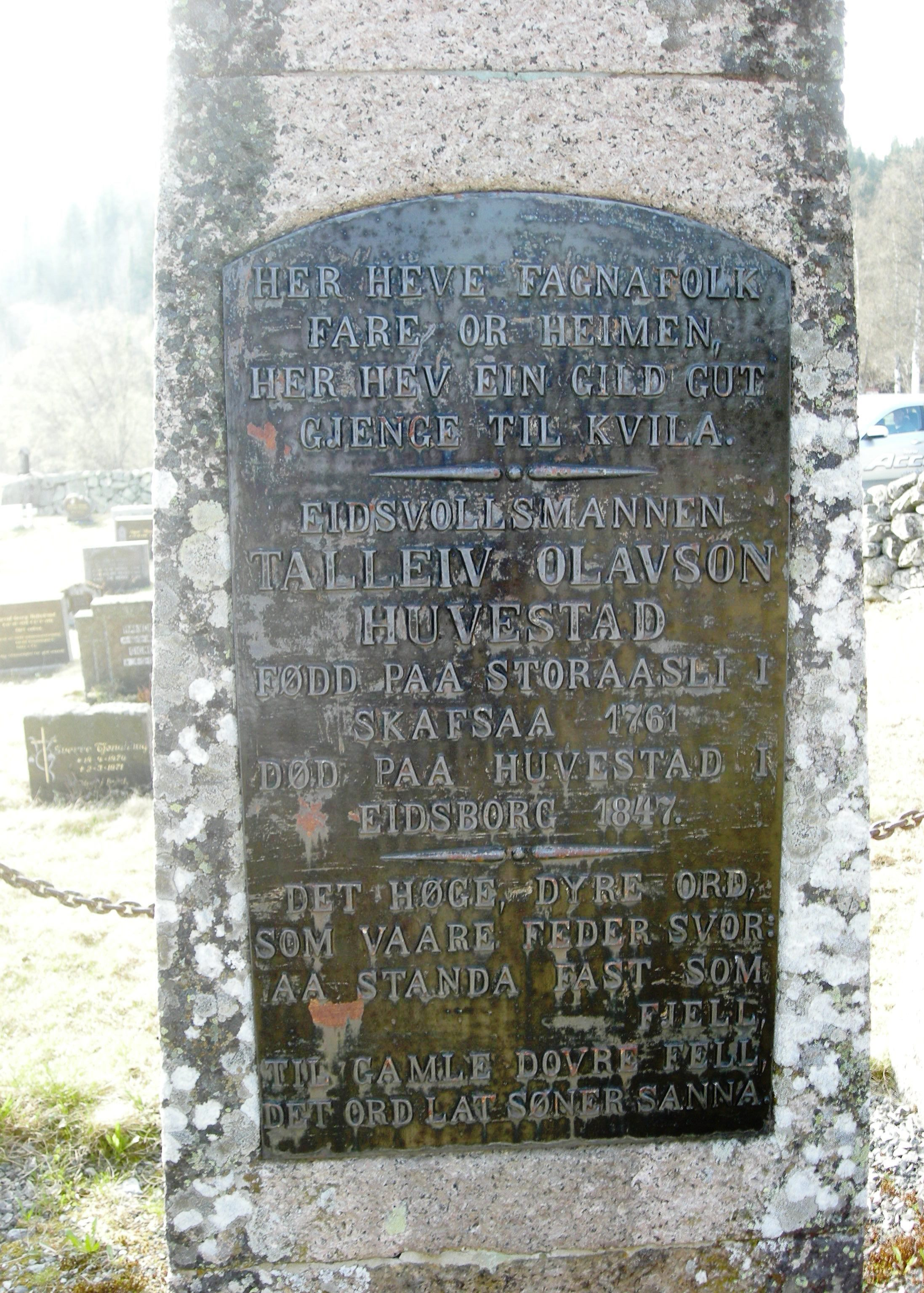
Talleiv - born on Storaasli farm near Skafså Church

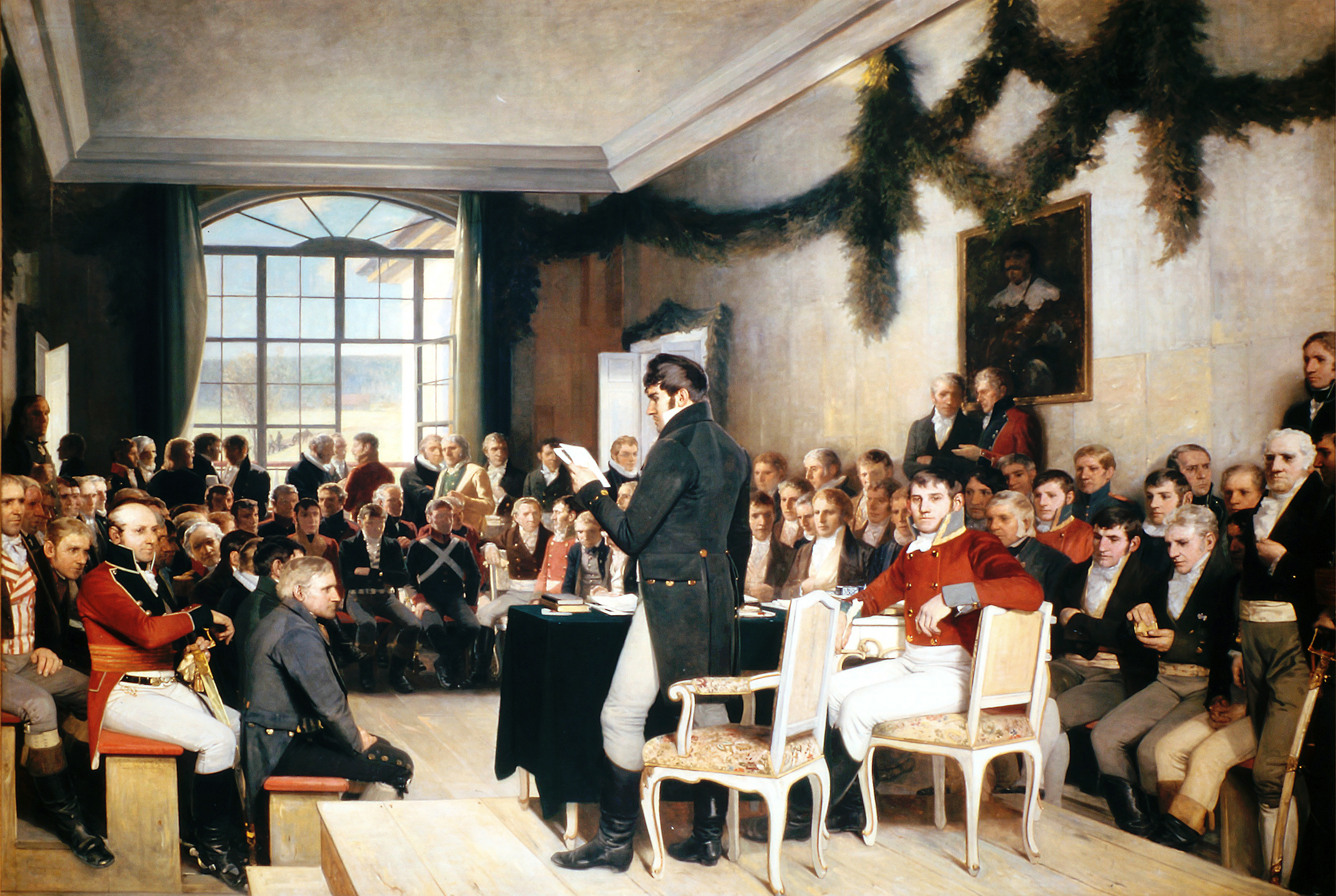
Painting: Eidsvold 1814

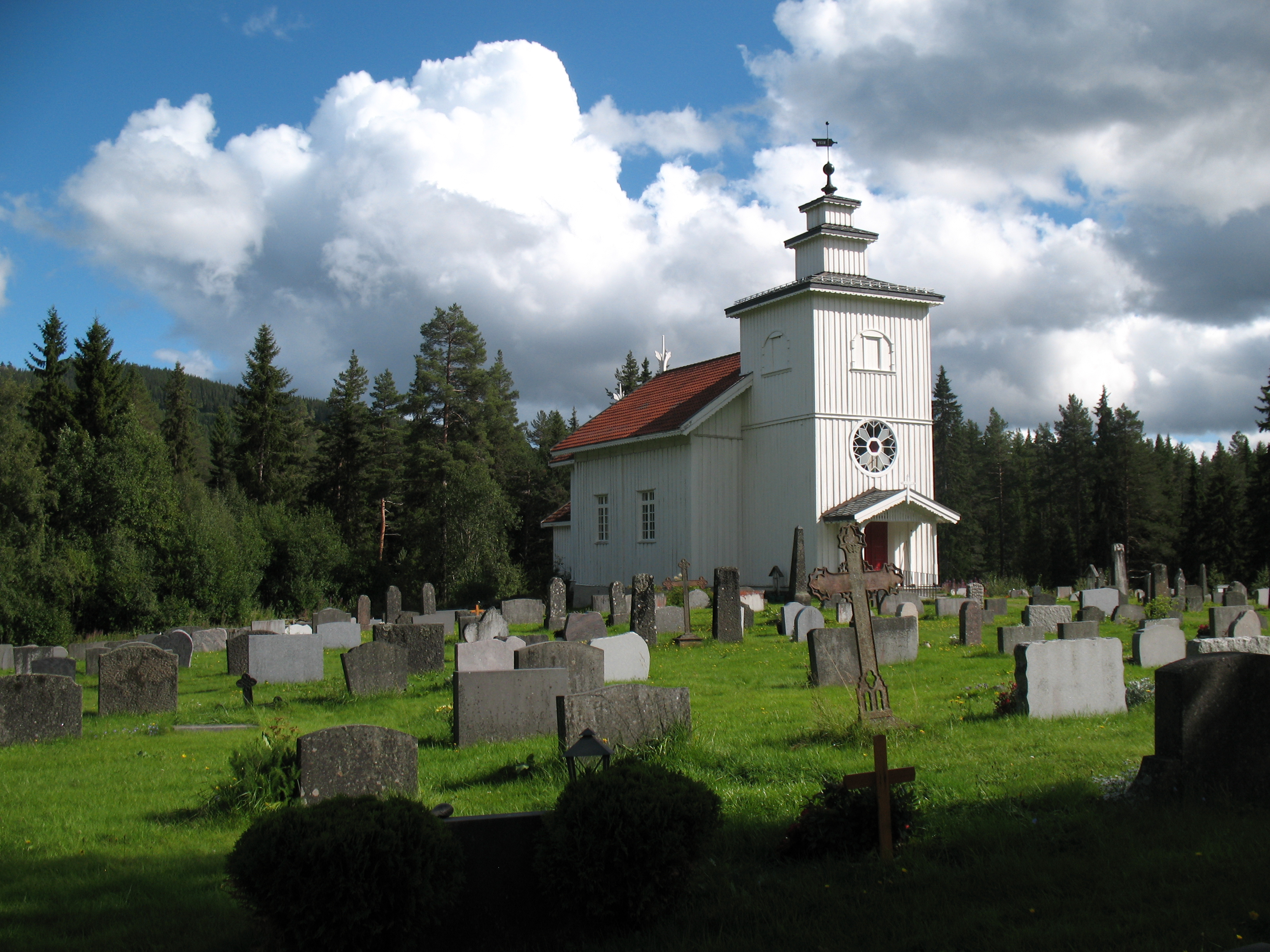
Skafså Church
