= Øvre Byrte =

Village in Tokke Municipality, Norway

- Village
- Interactive map of Øvre Byrte
- Coordinates: 59.55975°N 7.81198°E
- Country: Norway
- Region: Eastern Norway
- County: Telemark
- District: Vest-Telemark
- Municipality: Tokke Municipality
- Elevation: 472 m (1,549 ft)
- Time zone: UTC+01:00 (CET)
  - Summer (DST): UTC+02:00 (CEST)
- Post Code: 3880 Dalen

Øvre Byrte is a small village in Tokke Municipality in Telemark county, Norway. The village is located at the end of the Byrtedalen valley where the river Byrteåi flows into the lake Byrtevatn. The village lies about 6 kilometres (3.7 mi) south of Vinjesvingen (in Vinje Municipality) and about 20 kilometres (12 mi) to the northwest of the village of Dalen.
