= Carl Olsson =

Carl Olsson may refer to:

- Carl Olsson (referee) (1892–1971), Swedish football referee
- Carl Olsson, Swedish keyboard player with The Bear Quartet
- Carl Robert Olsson, athlete
- Les Olsson (Carl Lester Olsson), American football player

== See also ==
- Carl Olson (disambiguation)
- Carl Olsen (disambiguation)
- Karl Olsen, Norwegian civil servant
