= Mo Municipality =

Former municipality in Telemark, Norway

Mo Municipality Mo herad
- Former municipality
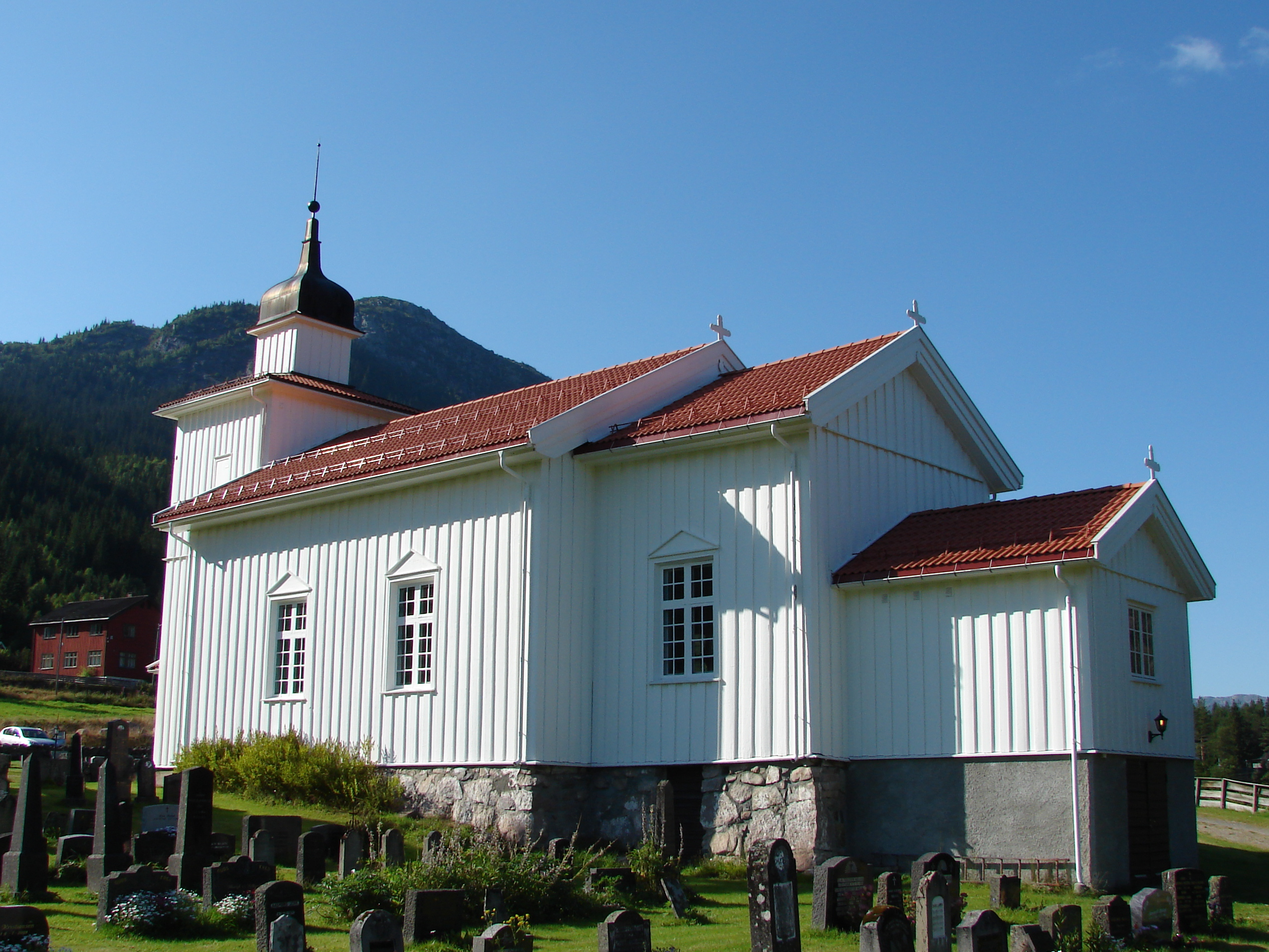
- View of the local church

- Telemark within Norway

- Mo within Telemark
- Coordinates: 59°29′02″N 7°50′24″E
- Country: Norway
- County: Telemark
- District: Vest-Telemark
- Established: 1 Jan 1838
  - Created as: Formannskapsdistrikt
- Disestablished: 1 Jan 1964
  - Succeeded by: Tokke Municipality
- Administrative centre: Vistad

Government
  - Mayor (1952–1963): Tarjei Bekk

Area (upon dissolution)
  - Total: 694.5 km^{2} (268.1 sq mi)
  - Rank: #140 in Norway
- Highest elevation: 1,537.75 m (5,045.1 ft)

Population (1963)
  - Total: 1,673
  - Rank: #503 in Norway
  - Density: 2.4/km^{2} (6.2/sq mi)
  - Change (10 years): ▲ +2.9%
- Demonym(s): Mobyggje; Mobygg

Official language
  - Norwegian form: Nynorsk
- Time zone: UTC+01:00 (CET)
  - Summer (DST): UTC+02:00 (CEST)
- ISO 3166 code: NO-0832

Mo (Norwegian pronunciation: [muː]; locally [møː]) is a former municipality in Telemark county, Norway. The 694.5-square-kilometre (268.1 sq mi) municipality existed from 1838 until its dissolution in 1964. The area is now part of Tokke Municipality in the traditional district of Øvre Telemark. The administrative centre was the village of Vistad which is located just west of the present village of Dalen.

Prior to its dissolution in 1964, the 694.5-square-kilometre (268.1 sq mi) municipality was the 140th largest by area out of the 689 municipalities in Norway. Mo Municipality was the 503rd most populous municipality in Norway with a population of about 1,673. The municipality's population density was 2.4 inhabitants per square kilometre (6.2/sq mi) and its population had increased by 2.9% over the previous 10-year period.

== General information ==
=== Administrative history ===
The formannskapsdistrikt law of 1837 created a system of local government in Norway by establishing each Church of Norway prestegjeld as a civil municipality. On 1 January 1838, Mo prestegjeld was established as Mo Municipality. In 1879, there was a small border adjustment where a part of Laardal Municipality (population: 6) was transferred to Mo Municipality.

During the 1960s, there were many municipal mergers across Norway due to the work of the Schei Committee. On 1 January 1964, Mo Municipality (population: 1,658) was dissolved and merged with Lårdal Municipality (population: 1,929) to form the new Tokke Municipality.

=== Name ===
The municipality is named after the old Mo prestegjeld. The prestegjeld was named after the old Mo farm (Old Norse: Mór) since the first Mo Church was built there. The name is identical with the word mór which means "heath" or "moorland".

=== Churches ===
The Church of Norway had two parishes (sokn) within Mo Municipality. At the time of the municipal dissolution, it was part of the Mo prestegjeld and the Vest-Telemark prosti (deanery) in the Diocese of Agder.

Churches in Mo Municipality
Parish (sokn)	Church name	Location of the church	Year built
Mo	Mo Church	Mo	1839
Skafså	Skafså Church	Skafså	1839

== Geography ==
The highest point in the municipality was the 1,537.75-metre (5,045.1 ft) tall mountain Kvannfjølli. Vinje Municipality was located to the north and northeast, Lårdal Municipality was located to the east, Kviteseid Municipality was located to the southeast, Fyresdal Municipality was located to the south, Valle Municipality (in Aust-Agder county) was located to the southwest, and Bykle Municipality (in Aust-Agder county) was located to the west.

== Government ==
While it existed, Mo Municipality was responsible for primary education (through 10th grade), outpatient health services, senior citizen services, welfare and other social services, zoning, economic development, and municipal roads and utilities. The municipality was governed by a municipal council of directly elected representatives. The mayor was indirectly elected by a vote of the municipal council. The municipality was under the jurisdiction of the Vest-Telemark District Court and the Agder Court of Appeal.

=== Municipal council ===
The municipal council (Heradsstyre) of Mo Municipality was made up of 21 representatives that were elected to four year terms. The tables below show the historical composition of the council by political party.

Mo heradsstyre 1959–1963
Party name (in Nynorsk)	Number of representatives
Labour Party (Arbeidarpartiet)	13
Christian Democratic Party (Kristeleg Folkeparti)	2
Centre Party (Senterpartiet)	5
Liberal Party (Venstre)	1
Total number of members:	21
Note: On 1 January 1964, Mo Municipality became part of Tokke Municipality.

Mo heradsstyre 1955–1959
Party name (in Nynorsk)	Number of representatives
Labour Party (Arbeidarpartiet)	11
Communist Party (Kommunistiske Parti)	1
Christian Democratic Party (Kristeleg Folkeparti)	4
Joint List(s) of Non-Socialist Parties (Borgarlege Felleslister)	5
Total number of members:	21

Mo heradsstyre 1951–1955
Party name (in Nynorsk)	Number of representatives
Labour Party (Arbeidarpartiet)	11
Communist Party (Kommunistiske Parti)	2
Joint List(s) of Non-Socialist Parties (Borgarlege Felleslister)	11
Total number of members:	24

Mo heradsstyre 1947–1951
Party name (in Nynorsk)	Number of representatives
Labour Party (Arbeidarpartiet)	8
Communist Party (Kommunistiske Parti)	3
Christian Democratic Party (Kristeleg Folkeparti)	3
Joint List(s) of Non-Socialist Parties (Borgarlege Felleslister)	10
Total number of members:	24

Mo heradsstyre 1945–1947
Party name (in Nynorsk)	Number of representatives
Labour Party (Arbeidarpartiet)	13
Joint List(s) of Non-Socialist Parties (Borgarlege Felleslister)	7
Local List(s) (Lokale lister)	4
Total number of members:	24

Mo heradsstyre 1937–1941*
Party name (in Nynorsk)	Number of representatives
Labour Party (Arbeidarpartiet)	12
Joint list of the Farmers' Party (Bondepartiet) and the Liberal Party (Venstre)	12
Total number of members:	24
Note: Due to the German occupation of Norway during World War II, no elections were held for new municipal councils until after the war ended in 1945.

=== Mayors ===
The mayor (Nynorsk: ordførar) of Mo Municipality was the political leader of the municipality and the chairperson of the municipal council. The following people have held this position:

- 1838–1843: P.B Wettergreen
- 1844–1845: Talleiv Tarjeisen Løvig
- 1847–1855: Aanund Knudsen Mostøyl
- 1856–1867: Olaf Storaaslid
- 1868–1870: Aanund Knudsen Mostøyl
- 1871–1884: Olav Johnsen Midtbø
- 1885–1887: Olav L. Felland
- 1888–1889: Gjermund O. Holten
- 1890–1892: Olav L. Felland
- 1893–1900: Olav O. Brattestaa
- 1901–1904: Gjermund O. Holten
- 1905–1910: Dreng Nordjordet
- 1911–1913: Steinar G. Aamdal
- 1914–1916: Olav O. Bergland
- 1917–1919: Steinar G. Aamdal
- 1920–1922: Aasmund Tveito
- 1923–1928: Jon Vistad
- 1929–1931: Aasmund Tveito
- 1932–1937: Jon Vistad
- 1938–1941: Olav G. Nystad
- 1945–1945: Olav Koldkjenn
- 1946–1947: Tarjei Bekk
- 1948–1951: Olaus G. Johre
- 1952–1963: Tarjei Bekk

== See also ==
- List of former municipalities of Norway
