= Botnedalen =

Valley in Telemark, Norway

- Floor elevation: 798 m (2,618 ft)

Geology
- Type: River valley

Geography
- Location: Telemark, Norway
- Coordinates: 59.49264°N 7.73785°E

Location
- Interactive map of Botnedalen

Botnedalen is a valley in Tokke Municipality in Telemark county, Norway. The valley used to be the site a number of mountain farms that are no longer in use. The river that runs through the valley was dammed, creating the lake Botnedalsvatn. The lake is as a reservoir for the nearby Byrte Hydroelectric Power Station. Botnedalen is known for the occurrence of various minerals, including hausmannite, jacobsite, braunite, bustamite, and rhodonite.
