= Arvid Torgeir Lie =

Norwegian writer (1938–2020)

- Born: 18 August 1938; Skafså, Norway
- Died: 19 May 2020 (aged 81)
- Occupation: writer

Arvid Torgeir Lie (18 August 1938 – 19 May 2020) was a Norwegian poet, writer of short stories and translator. He was born in the village of Skafså in Mo Municipality (in the present-day Tokke Municipality). Among his poetry collections are Under fuglens vengjekross (1967) and Snøvinter (1968), and his collection of short stories, Den nye maskina og andre noveller, came in 1986.

He received the Halldis Moren Vesaas Prize in 1995, and the Dobloug Prize in 2007.

Lie died on 19 May 2020.
