= Skafså =

Village in Tokke Municipality, Norway

- Village
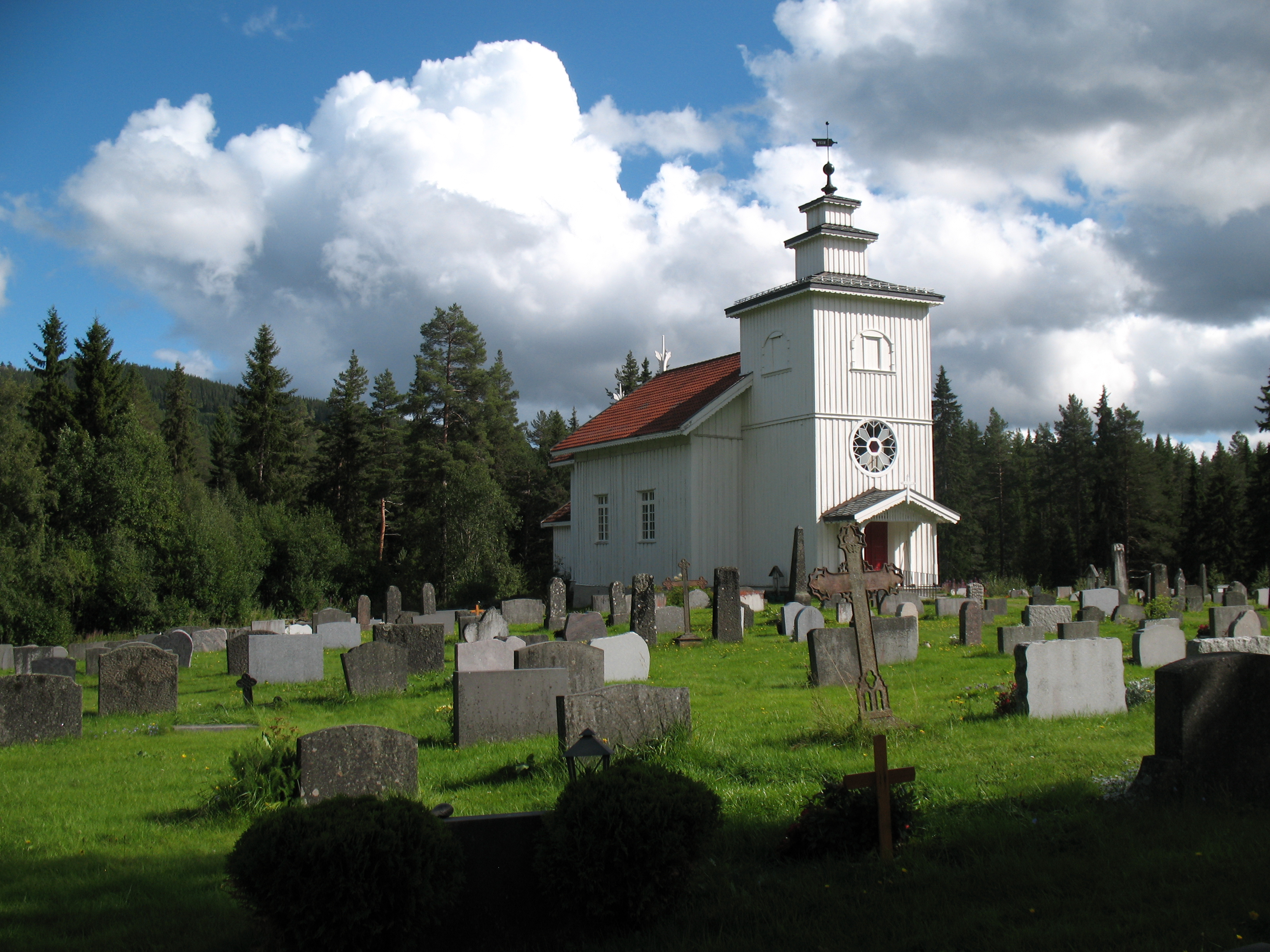
- View of the local Skafså Church
- Interactive map of Skafså
- Coordinates: 59.40761°N 8.01328°E
- Country: Norway
- Region: Eastern Norway
- County: Telemark
- District: Vest-Telemark
- Municipality: Tokke Municipality
- Elevation: 503 m (1,650 ft)
- Time zone: UTC+01:00 (CET)
  - Summer (DST): UTC+02:00 (CEST)
- Post Code: 3880 Dalen

Skafså is a village area in Tokke Municipality in Telemark county, Norway. It is located about 6 kilometres (3.7 mi) southeast of the village of Dalen and about 5 kilometres (3.1 mi) northwest of the village of Åmdals verk. Skafså Church (built and consecrated in 1839) is located in the village. The mountain farm Grimdalen, today a museum (Grimdalstunet), has farm buildings from the time of barter economy in the 17th century. Nearby is a collection of around 300 of Anne Grimdalen's sculptures.

== Notable people ==
- Talleiv Huvestad (1761–1847), a teacher, farmer and politician
- Vetle Vislie (1858–1933), a educationalist and writer
- Anne Grimdalen (1899–1961), a sculptor
- Arvid Torgeir Lie (1938–2020), a poet, writer of short stories, and translator
