= Åmdals verk =

Village in Tokke Municipality, Norway

Åmdals verk Åmdalsverk
- Village
- Interactive map of Åmdals verk
- Coordinates: 59.37613°N 8.03645°E
- Country: Norway
- Region: Eastern Norway
- County: Telemark
- District: Vest-Telemark
- Municipality: Tokke Municipality
- Elevation: 425 m (1,394 ft)
- Time zone: UTC+01:00 (CET)
  - Summer (DST): UTC+02:00 (CEST)
- Post Code: 3882 Åmdals Verk

Åmdals verk is a small village in Tokke Municipality in Telemark county, Norway. The village is located about 8 kilometres (5.0 mi) south of the municipal center of Dalen. The village is the site of a former copper mine. The mines were operational between 1691 and 1945, during which 8,000 tonnes (7,900 long tons; 8,800 short tons) of copper were extracted from the ground. A branch of the Vest-Telemark Museum chronicles the history of the mines, and some of the tunnels are open to the public on guided tours during the summer season.
