= Byrte Hydroelectric Power Station =

Hydroelectric power station in Norway

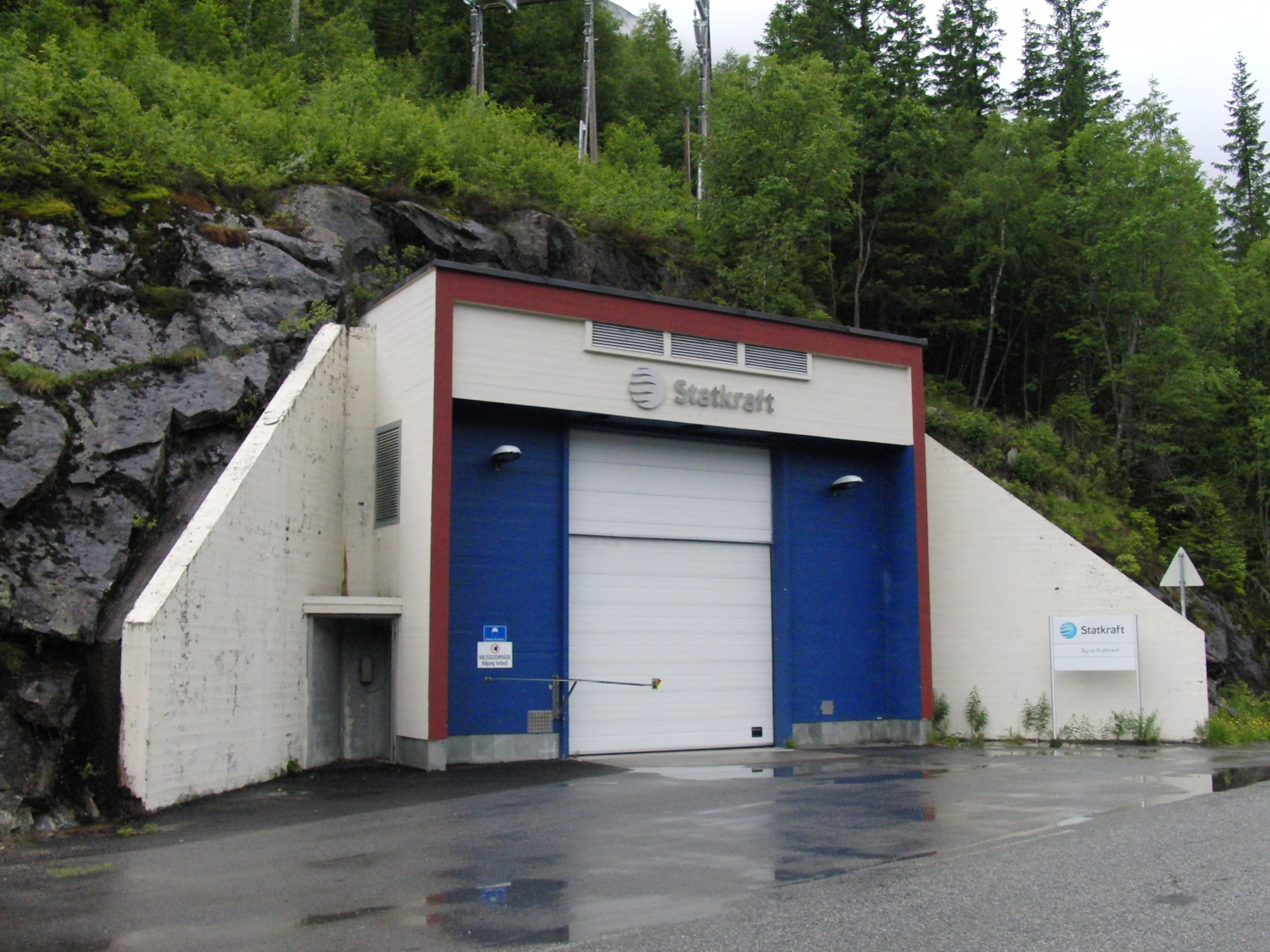
- Interactive map of Byrte Hydroelectric Power Station
- Official name: Byrte kraftverk
- Country: Norway
- Location: Tokke Municipality
- Coordinates: 59°29′46″N 7°50′00″E
- Opening date: 1969; 57 years ago
- Owner: Statkraft

Reservoir
- Creates: Botnedalsvatn

Power Station
- Hydraulic head: 290 metres (950 ft)
- Installed capacity: 20 MW
- Capacity factor: 63.9%
- Annual generation: 112 GW·h

The Byrte Power Station is a hydroelectric power station located near the lake Byrtevatn in Tokke Municipality in Telemark county, Norway. It exploits the water from the lake Botnedalsvatn, a height difference of 290 metres (950 ft).
