= Tokke Municipality =

Municipality in Telemark, Norway

Tokke Municipality Tokke kommune
- Municipality
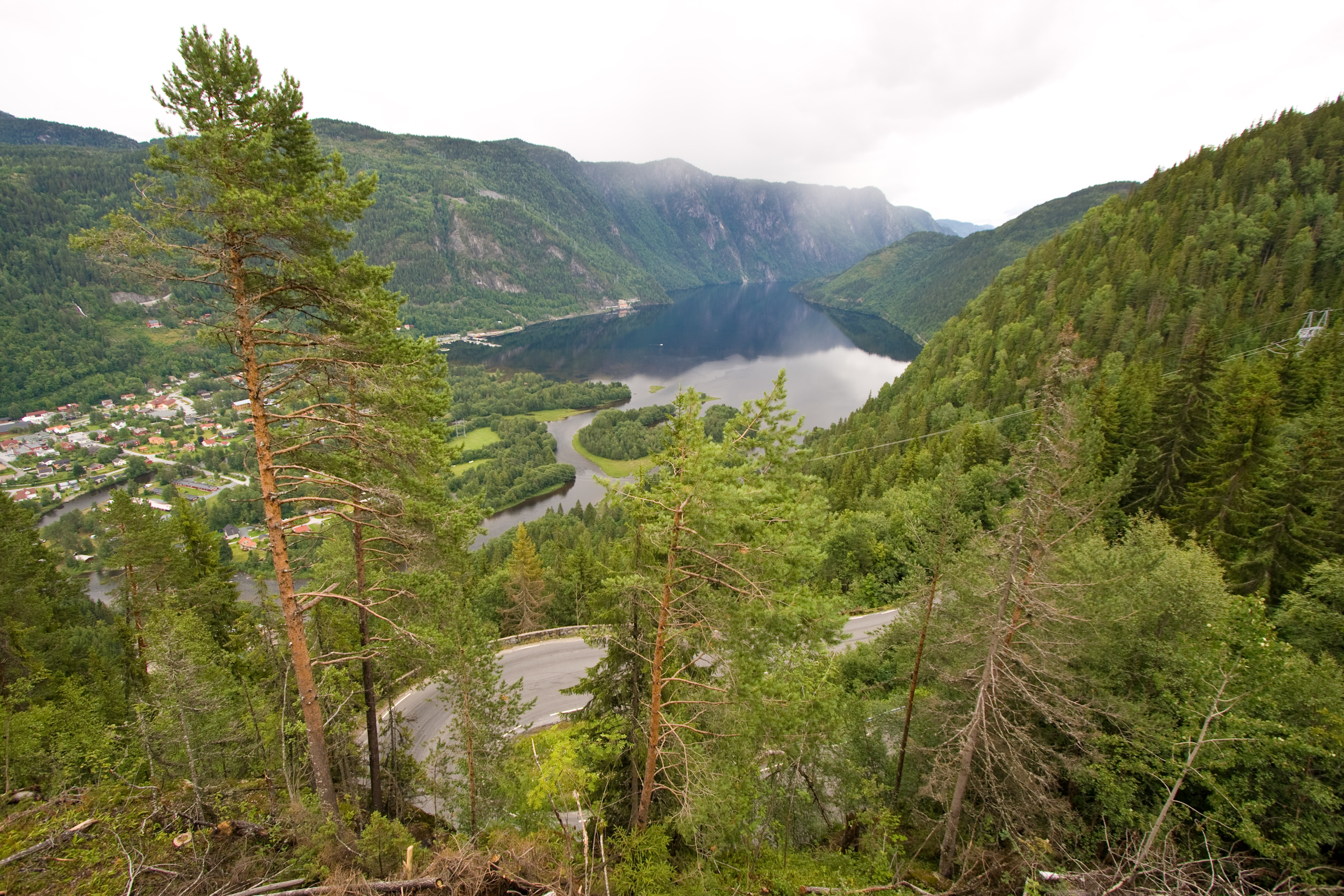
- View of Dalen and Bandak

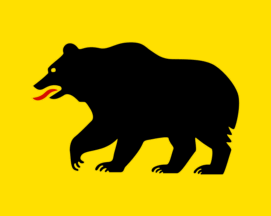
- Flag Coat of arms

- Telemark within Norway

- Tokke within Telemark
- Coordinates: 59°25′2″N 7°58′43″E
- Country: Norway
- County: Telemark
- District: Vest-Telemark
- Established: 1 Jan 1964
  - Preceded by: Lårdal Municipality and Mo Municipality
- Administrative centre: Dalen

Government
  - Mayor (2015): Jarand Felland (Sp)

Area
  - Total: 984.58 km^{2} (380.15 sq mi)
  - Land: 904.65 km^{2} (349.29 sq mi)
  - Water: 79.93 km^{2} (30.86 sq mi) 8.1%
  - Rank: #117 in Norway
- Highest elevation: 1,537.75 m (5,045.1 ft)

Population (2026)
  - Total: 2,242
  - Rank: #268 in Norway
  - Density: 2.5/km^{2} (6.5/sq mi)
  - Change (10 years): ▼ −0.2%
- Demonym(s): Daling, Eidsboring, Lårdøl, Skafsåing, Tokkebu

Official language
  - Norwegian form: Nynorsk
- Time zone: UTC+01:00 (CET)
  - Summer (DST): UTC+02:00 (CEST)
- ISO 3166 code: NO-4034
- Website: Official website

Tokke (Norwegian pronunciation: [¹tɔkːə]; locally [¹tʊkːɛ]) is a municipality in Telemark county, Norway. It is located in the traditional district of Vest-Telemark. The administrative centre of the municipality is the village of Dalen. Other villages in the municipality include Åmdals Verk, Eidsborg, Høydalsmo, Lårdal, and Øvre Byrte. The Eidsborg Stave Church is one of Norway's old stave churches and it is located in Eidsborg, just north of Dalen.

The 984.58-square-kilometre (380.15 sq mi) municipality is the 117th largest by area out of the 357 municipalities in Norway. Tokke Municipality is the 268th most populous municipality in Norway with a population of 2,242. The municipality's population density is 2.5 inhabitants per square kilometre (6.5/sq mi) and its population has decreased by 0.2% over the previous 10-year period.

== General information ==
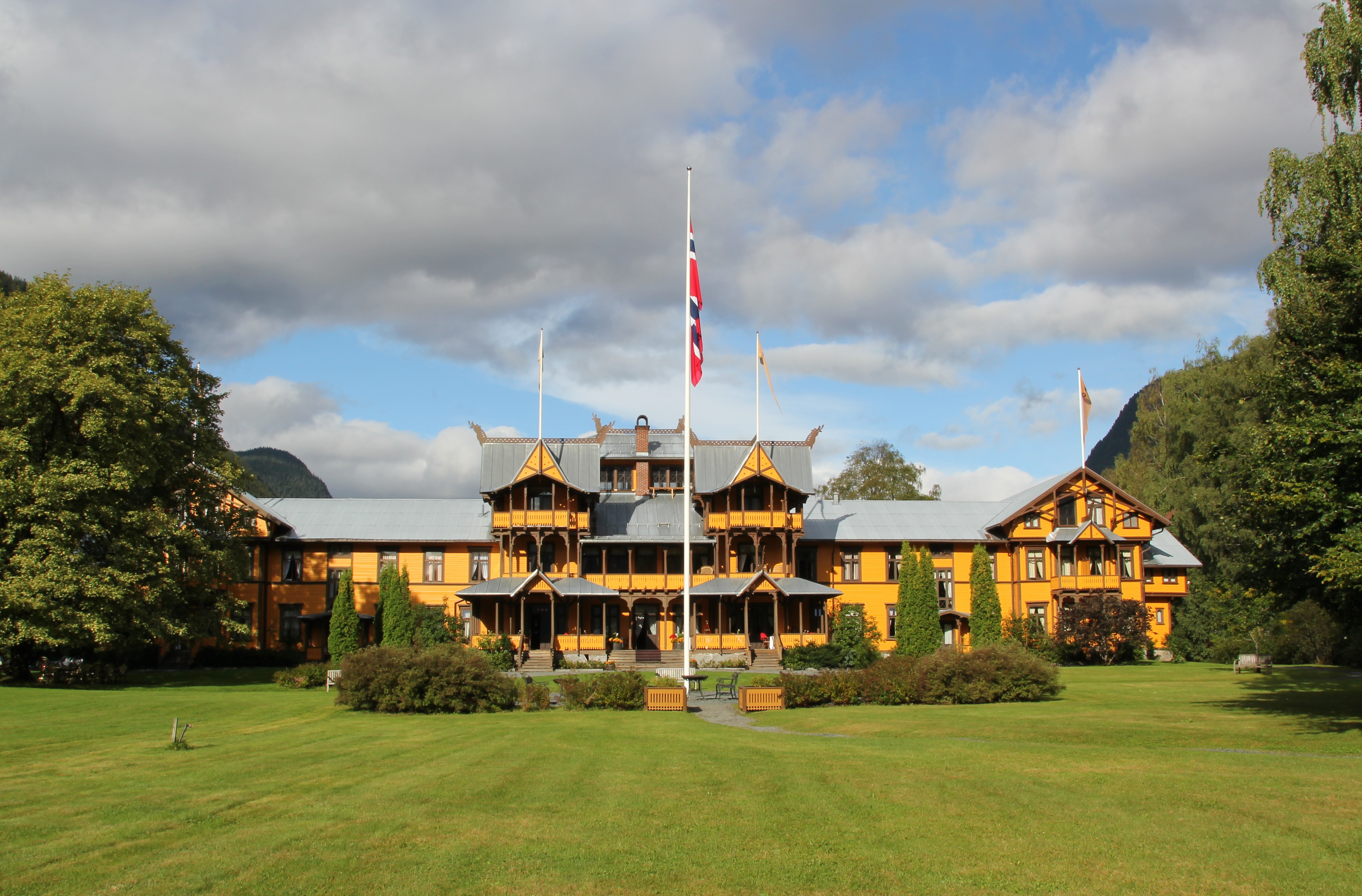
Dalen Hotel

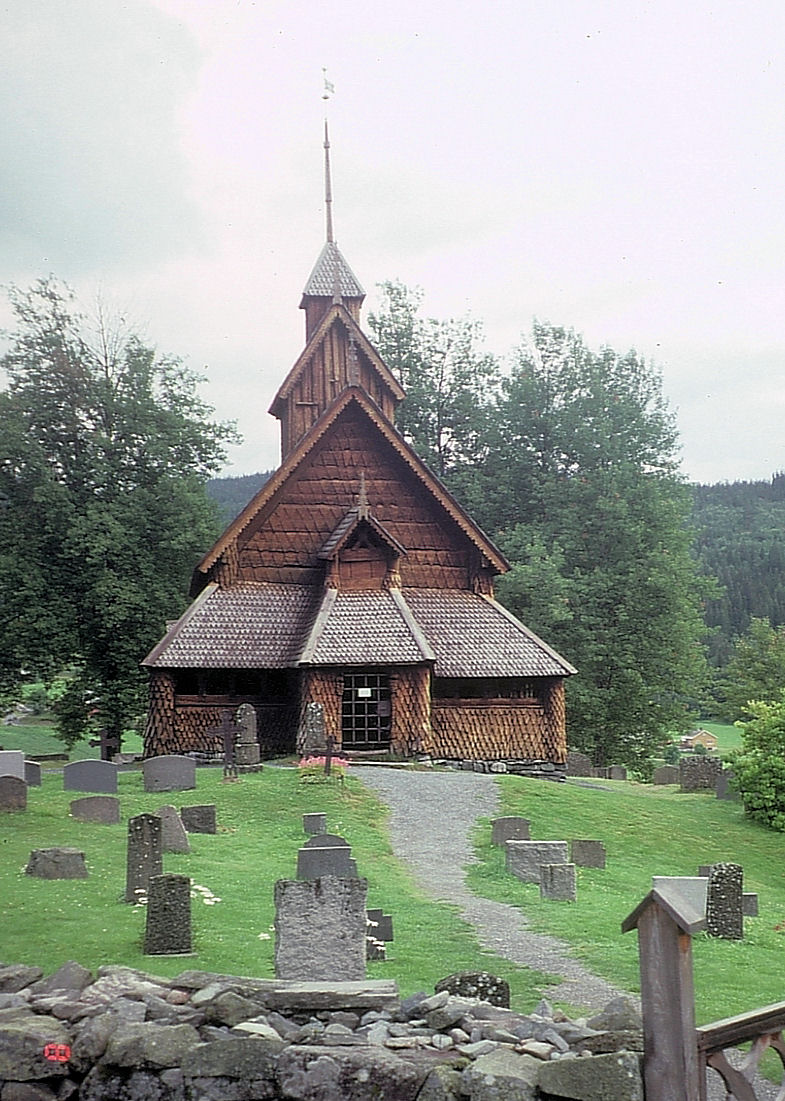
Eidsborg Stave Church

=== Administrative history ===
During the 1960s, there were many municipal changes across Norway due to the work of the Schei Committee. The municipality of Tokke was established on 1 January 1964 when Lårdal Municipality (population: 1,929) and Mo Municipality (population: 1,658) were merged to form the new Tokke Municipality. The borders of the municipality have not changed since that time (which is pretty rare among municipalities in Norway).

In 2020, there were many municipal and county mergers across Norway due to the work of the Solberg cabinet. Historically, this municipality was part of Telemark county. On 1 January 2020, the municipality became a part of the newly-formed Vestfold og Telemark county (after Telemark and Vestfold counties were merged). The merger was shortlived, and on 1 January 2024, the merger was undone and this municipality became part of Telemark county once again.

=== Name ===
The municipality is named after the local river Tokke (Old Norse: Þotka). The name is related to the name of the lake Totak (from which the river originates). The river name is probably derived from the Old Norse word þot meaning "roaring", "rushing", or "howling".

=== Coat of arms ===
The coat of arms was granted on 6 February 1987. The official blazon is "Or a bear passant sable" (Norwegian: På gulll grunn ein gåande svart bjørn). This means the arms have a field (background) with a tincture of Or which means it is commonly colored yellow, but if it is made out of metal, then gold is used. The charge is a bear which is displayed with a tincture of sable which means it is black. The bear symbolizes the rich nature in the forests in the municipality. The bear also plays a major role in many local legends and stories. The arms were designed by Stein Davidsen. The municipal flag has the same design as the coat of arms.

=== Churches ===
The Church of Norway has two parishes (sokn) within Tokke Municipality. It is part of the Øvre Telemark prosti (deanery) in the Diocese of Agder og Telemark.

Churches in Tokke Municipality
| Parish (sokn) | Church name | Location of the church | Year built |
|---|---|---|---|
| Eidsborg, Mo, og Skafså | Eidsborg Stave Church | Eidsborg | 1200s |
| Eidsborg, Mo, og Skafså | Mo Church | Mo | 1839 |
| Eidsborg, Mo, og Skafså | Skafså Church | Skafså | 1839 |
| Høydalsmo og Lårdal | Høydalsmo Church | Høydalsmo | 1747 |
| Høydalsmo og Lårdal | Lårdal Church | Lårdal | 1831 |

== Geography ==
Tokke Municipality is located in the Vest-Telemark region. The highest point in the municipality is the 1,537.75-metre (5,045.1 ft) tall mountain Kvannfjølli. Other mountains in Tokke including Brandsnutene, Gråsteinsnosi, Sæbyggjenuten, Stølsdalsnutane, and Svolhusgreini. The river Tokke and the lakes Bandak, Botnedalsvatn, and Byrtevatn are all located in the municipality as well.

Vinje Municipality is located to the north, Seljord Municipality is located to the northeast, Kviteseid Municipality is located to the east, Fyresdal Municipality is located to the south, Valle Municipality is located to the southwest, and Bykle Municipality (in Agder county) is located to the west.

=== Climate ===
Climate data for Høydalsmo II 1991–2020 (560 m, avg high/low 2007-2025)
| Month | Jan | Feb | Mar | Apr | May | Jun | Jul | Aug | Sep | Oct | Nov | Dec | Year |
|---|---|---|---|---|---|---|---|---|---|---|---|---|---|
| Mean daily maximum °C (°F) | −2 (28) | 0.2 (32.4) | 4.1 (39.4) | 8.3 (46.9) | 13.6 (56.5) | 17.9 (64.2) | 19.4 (66.9) | 17.5 (63.5) | 13.8 (56.8) | 8.1 (46.6) | 2.6 (36.7) | −1.6 (29.1) | 8.5 (47.3) |
| Daily mean °C (°F) | −5.8 (21.6) | −5.4 (22.3) | −2.5 (27.5) | 2 (36) | 7 (45) | 11.2 (52.2) | 13.5 (56.3) | 12.2 (54.0) | 8.4 (47.1) | 3.1 (37.6) | −1.4 (29.5) | −5.5 (22.1) | 3.1 (37.6) |
| Mean daily minimum °C (°F) | −11 (12) | −10.5 (13.1) | −7.4 (18.7) | −3 (27) | 1.6 (34.9) | 6 (43) | 8.3 (46.9) | 7.1 (44.8) | 4.4 (39.9) | −0.2 (31.6) | −4.6 (23.7) | −9.9 (14.2) | −1.6 (29.1) |
| Average precipitation mm (inches) | 85 (3.3) | 54 (2.1) | 53 (2.1) | 51 (2.0) | 69 (2.7) | 85 (3.3) | 104 (4.1) | 107 (4.2) | 97 (3.8) | 107 (4.2) | 92 (3.6) | 79 (3.1) | 983 (38.5) |
Source 1: yr.no
Source 2: Seklima (avg highs/lows)

== Government ==
Tokke Municipality is responsible for primary education (through 10th grade), outpatient health services, senior citizen services, welfare and other social services, zoning, economic development, and municipal roads and utilities. The municipality is governed by a municipal council of directly elected representatives. The mayor is indirectly elected by a vote of the municipal council. The municipality is under the jurisdiction of the Øvre Telemark District Court and the Agder Court of Appeal.

=== Municipal council ===
The municipal council (Kommunestyre) of Tokke Municipality is made up of 21 representatives that are elected to four-year terms. The tables below show the current and historical composition of the council by political party.

Tokke kommunestyre 2023–2027
| Party name (in Nynorsk) | Number of representatives |
|---|---|
| Labour Party (Arbeidarpartiet) | 6 |
| Green Party (Miljøpartiet Dei Grøne) | 1 |
| Conservative Party (Høgre) | 2 |
| Christian Democratic Party (Kristeleg Folkeparti) | 1 |
| Centre Party (Senterpartiet) | 10 |
| Socialist Left Party (Sosialistisk Venstreparti) | 1 |
| Total number of members: | 21 |

Tokke kommunestyre 2019–2023
| Party name (in Nynorsk) | Number of representatives |
|---|---|
| Labour Party (Arbeidarpartiet) | 8 |
| Green Party (Miljøpartiet Dei Grøne) | 2 |
| Christian Democratic Party (Kristeleg Folkeparti) | 1 |
| Centre Party (Senterpartiet) | 9 |
| Socialist Left Party (Sosialistisk Venstreparti) | 1 |
| Total number of members: | 21 |

Tokke kommunestyre 2015–2019
| Party name (in Nynorsk) | Number of representatives |
|---|---|
| Labour Party (Arbeidarpartiet) | 9 |
| Christian Democratic Party (Kristeleg Folkeparti) | 1 |
| Centre Party (Senterpartiet) | 11 |
| Total number of members: | 21 |

Tokke kommunestyre 2011–2015
| Party name (in Nynorsk) | Number of representatives |
|---|---|
| Labour Party (Arbeidarpartiet) | 10 |
| Progress Party (Framstegspartiet) | 1 |
| Conservative Party (Høgre) | 3 |
| Christian Democratic Party (Kristeleg Folkeparti) | 1 |
| Centre Party (Senterpartiet) | 6 |
| Total number of members: | 21 |

Tokke kommunestyre 2007–2011
| Party name (in Nynorsk) | Number of representatives |
|---|---|
| Labour Party (Arbeidarpartiet) | 8 |
| Progress Party (Framstegspartiet) | 1 |
| Conservative Party (Høgre) | 1 |
| Christian Democratic Party (Kristeleg Folkeparti) | 1 |
| Centre Party (Senterpartiet) | 9 |
| Socialist Left Party (Sosialistisk Venstreparti) | 1 |
| Total number of members: | 21 |

Tokke kommunestyre 2003–2007
| Party name (in Nynorsk) | Number of representatives |
|---|---|
| Labour Party (Arbeidarpartiet) | 7 |
| Progress Party (Framstegspartiet) | 1 |
| Conservative Party (Høgre) | 1 |
| Christian Democratic Party (Kristeleg Folkeparti) | 1 |
| Centre Party (Senterpartiet) | 9 |
| Socialist Left Party (Sosialistisk Venstreparti) | 2 |
| Total number of members: | 21 |

Tokke kommunestyre 1999–2003
| Party name (in Nynorsk) | Number of representatives |
|---|---|
| Labour Party (Arbeidarpartiet) | 8 |
| Conservative Party (Høgre) | 1 |
| Christian Democratic Party (Kristeleg Folkeparti) | 1 |
| Centre Party (Senterpartiet) | 9 |
| Socialist Left Party (Sosialistisk Venstreparti) | 1 |
| Cross-party local list (Tverrpolitisk bygdeliste) | 1 |
| Total number of members: | 21 |

Tokke kommunestyre 1995–1999
| Party name (in Nynorsk) | Number of representatives |
|---|---|
| Labour Party (Arbeidarpartiet) | 6 |
| Centre Party (Senterpartiet) | 10 |
| Socialist Left Party (Sosialistisk Venstreparti) | 1 |
| Joint list of the Conservative Party (Høgre) and Christian Democratic Party (Kristeleg Folkeparti) | 2 |
| Cross-party local list (Tverrpolitisk Bygdeliste) | 2 |
| Total number of members: | 21 |

Tokke kommunestyre 1991–1995
| Party name (in Nynorsk) | Number of representatives |
|---|---|
| Labour Party (Arbeidarpartiet) | 7 |
| Conservative Party (Høgre) | 2 |
| Socialist Left Party (Sosialistisk Venstreparti) | 3 |
| Joint list of the Centre Party (Senterpartiet) and the Christian Democratic Party (Kristeleg Folkeparti) | 7 |
| Cross-party local list (Tverrpolitisk Bygdeliste) | 2 |
| Total number of members: | 21 |

Tokke kommunestyre 1987–1991
| Party name (in Nynorsk) | Number of representatives |
|---|---|
| Labour Party (Arbeidarpartiet) | 11 |
| Conservative Party (Høgre) | 3 |
| Christian Democratic Party (Kristeleg Folkeparti) | 2 |
| Centre Party (Senterpartiet) | 3 |
| Socialist Left Party (Sosialistisk Venstreparti) | 2 |
| Cross-party local list (Tverrpolitisk Bygdeliste) | 8 |
| Total number of members: | 29 |

Tokke kommunestyre 1983–1987
| Party name (in Nynorsk) | Number of representatives |
|---|---|
| Labour Party (Arbeidarpartiet) | 14 |
| Socialist Left Party (Sosialistisk Venstreparti) | 2 |
| Joint list of the Conservative Party (Høgre), Christian Democratic Party (Kristeleg Folkeparti), and Centre Party (Senterpartiet) | 13 |
| Total number of members: | 29 |

Tokke kommunestyre 1979–1983
| Party name (in Nynorsk) | Number of representatives |
|---|---|
| Labour Party (Arbeidarpartiet) | 15 |
| Conservative Party (Høgre) | 4 |
| Christian Democratic Party (Kristeleg Folkeparti) | 3 |
| Centre Party (Senterpartiet) | 4 |
| Cross-party list (Tverrpolitisk liste) | 3 |
| Total number of members: | 29 |

Tokke kommunestyre 1975–1979
| Party name (in Nynorsk) | Number of representatives |
|---|---|
| Labour Party (Arbeidarpartiet) | 16 |
| Christian Democratic Party (Kristeleg Folkeparti) | 4 |
| Centre Party (Senterpartiet) | 6 |
| Socialist Left Party (Sosialistisk Venstreparti) | 1 |
| Non-party list (Upolitisk Liste) | 2 |
| Total number of members: | 29 |

Tokke kommunestyre 1971–1975
| Party name (in Nynorsk) | Number of representatives |
|---|---|
| Labour Party (Arbeidarpartiet) | 17 |
| Christian Democratic Party (Kristeleg Folkeparti) | 3 |
| Centre Party (Senterpartiet) | 7 |
| Liberal Party (Venstre) | 2 |
| Total number of members: | 29 |

Tokke kommunestyre 1967–1971
| Party name (in Nynorsk) | Number of representatives |
|---|---|
| Labour Party (Arbeidarpartiet) | 16 |
| Christian Democratic Party (Kristeleg Folkeparti) | 3 |
| Centre Party (Senterpartiet) | 7 |
| Socialist People's Party (Sosialistisk Folkeparti) | 1 |
| Liberal Party (Venstre) | 2 |
| Total number of members: | 29 |

Tokke kommunestyre 1963–1967
| Party name (in Nynorsk) | Number of representatives |
|---|---|
| Labour Party (Arbeidarpartiet) | 18 |
| Christian Democratic Party (Kristeleg Folkeparti) | 2 |
| Centre Party (Senterpartiet) | 6 |
| Socialist People's Party (Sosialistisk Folkeparti) | 1 |
| Liberal Party (Venstre) | 2 |
| Total number of members: | 29 |

=== Mayors ===
The mayor (Nynorsk: ordførar) of Tokke Municipality is the political leader of the municipality and the chairperson of the municipal council. The following people have held this position:

- 1964–1971: Gunvald Jupskås (Ap)
- 1971–1979: Olav K. Tho (Ap)
- 1979–1984: Gunvald Jupskås (Ap)
- 1984–1987: Marie Sund
- 1987–1989: Geirmund Skaalen (H)
- 1990–2005: Birger Nygård (Sp)
- 2005–2011: Olav Seltveit Urbø (Sp)
- 2011–2015: Hilde Alice Vågslid (Ap)
- 2015–present: Jarand Felland (Sp)

== Notable people ==
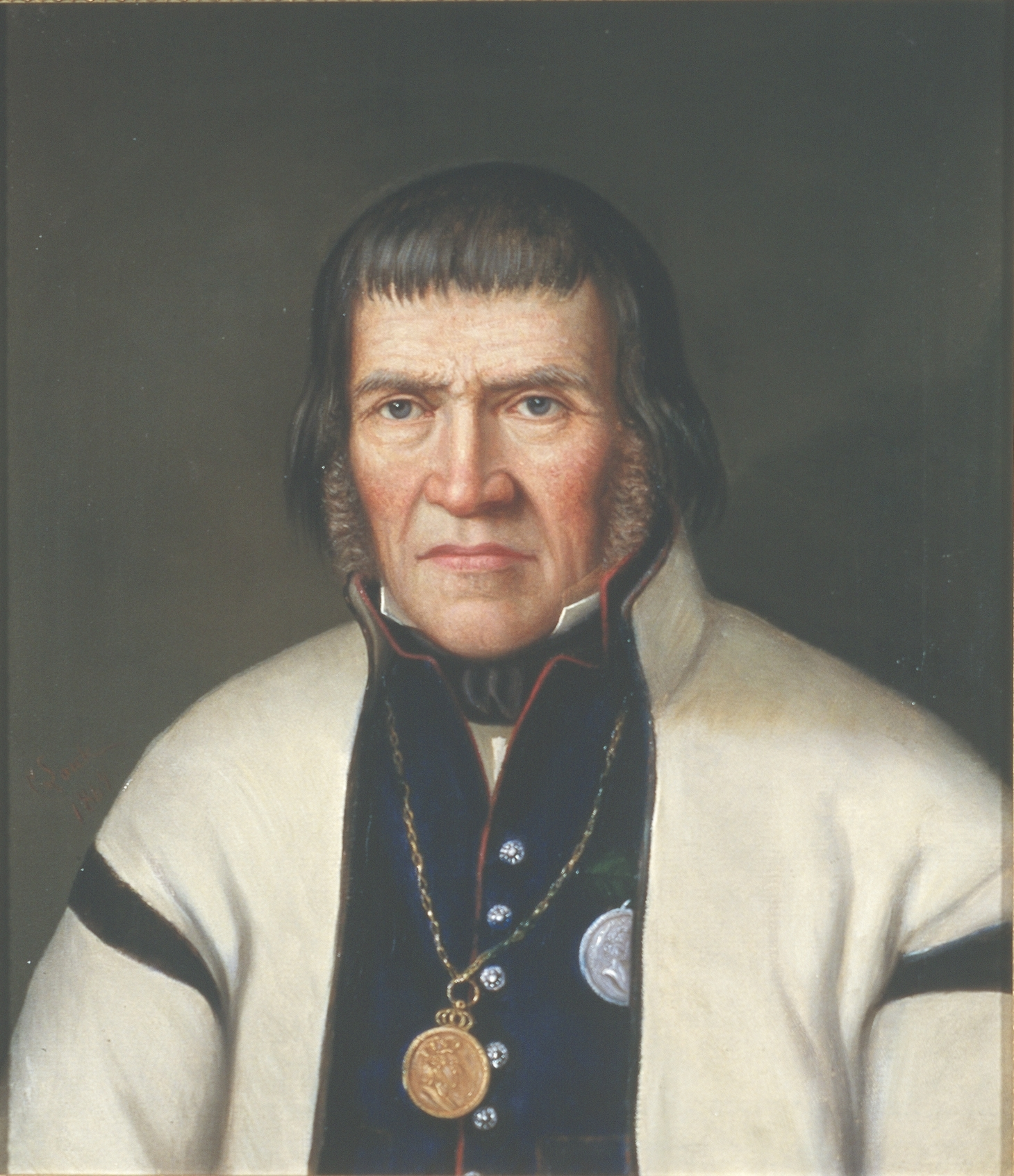
Talleiv Huvestad, 1814

- Talleiv Huvestad (1761 in Skafså – 1847), a teacher, farmer, and politician
- Søren Georg Abel (1772 in Mo – 1820), a priest and politician
- Jens Matthias Pram Kaurin (1804 in Lårdal – 1863), a theology professor and Lutheran priest
- Marcus Jacob Monrad (1816–1897), a philosopher and academic who grew up in Mo
- Vetle Vislie (1858 in Skafså – 1933), a educationalist, writer, and politician
- Alf Blütecher (1880 in Lårdal – 1959), an actor
- Thomas Offenberg Backer (1892 in Mo – 1987), an engineer
- Andreas Backer (1895 in Mo – 1975), a journalist and newspaper editor
- Anne Grimdalen (1899 in Skafså – 1961), a sculptor
- Eivind Groven (1901 in Eidsborg – 1977), a microtonal composer and music-theorist
- Arvid Torgeir Lie (1938 in Skafså – 2020), a poet, short story writer, and translator
- Lene Vågslid (born 1986 in Tokke), a teacher and politician
