= Botnedalsvatn =

Lake in Telemark, Norway

- Interactive map of Botnedalsvatn
- Location: Tokke Municipality, Telemark
- Coordinates: 59.49408°N 7.76717°E
- Catchment area: 80 km^{2} (31 sq mi)
- Basin countries: Norway
- Max. length: 4.5 kilometres (2.8 mi)
- Max. width: 1.7 kilometres (1.1 mi)
- Surface area: 3.12 km^{2} (1.20 sq mi)
- Max. depth: 12 metres (39 ft)
- Water volume: 1,660,000 m^{3} (1,350 acre⋅ft)
- Surface elevation: 740 metres (2,430 ft)
- References: NVE

Botnedalsvatn is a lake in Tokke Municipality in Telemark county, Norway. The 3.12-square-kilometre (1.20 sq mi) lake is located in the Botnedalen valley, about 12 kilometres (7.5 mi) to the northwest of the village of Dalen. Botnedalsvatn has a dam on the southeast end of the lake which regulates the surface elevation of the lake. The lake is used as a reservoir for the nearby Byrte Hydroelectric Power Station. Water flows from this lake through a tunnel into the power plant which is located at the southern end of the nearby lake Byrtevatn.

== See also ==
- List of lakes of Norway
