= Mo, Telemark =

Village in Tokke Municipality, Norway

Mo
- Village
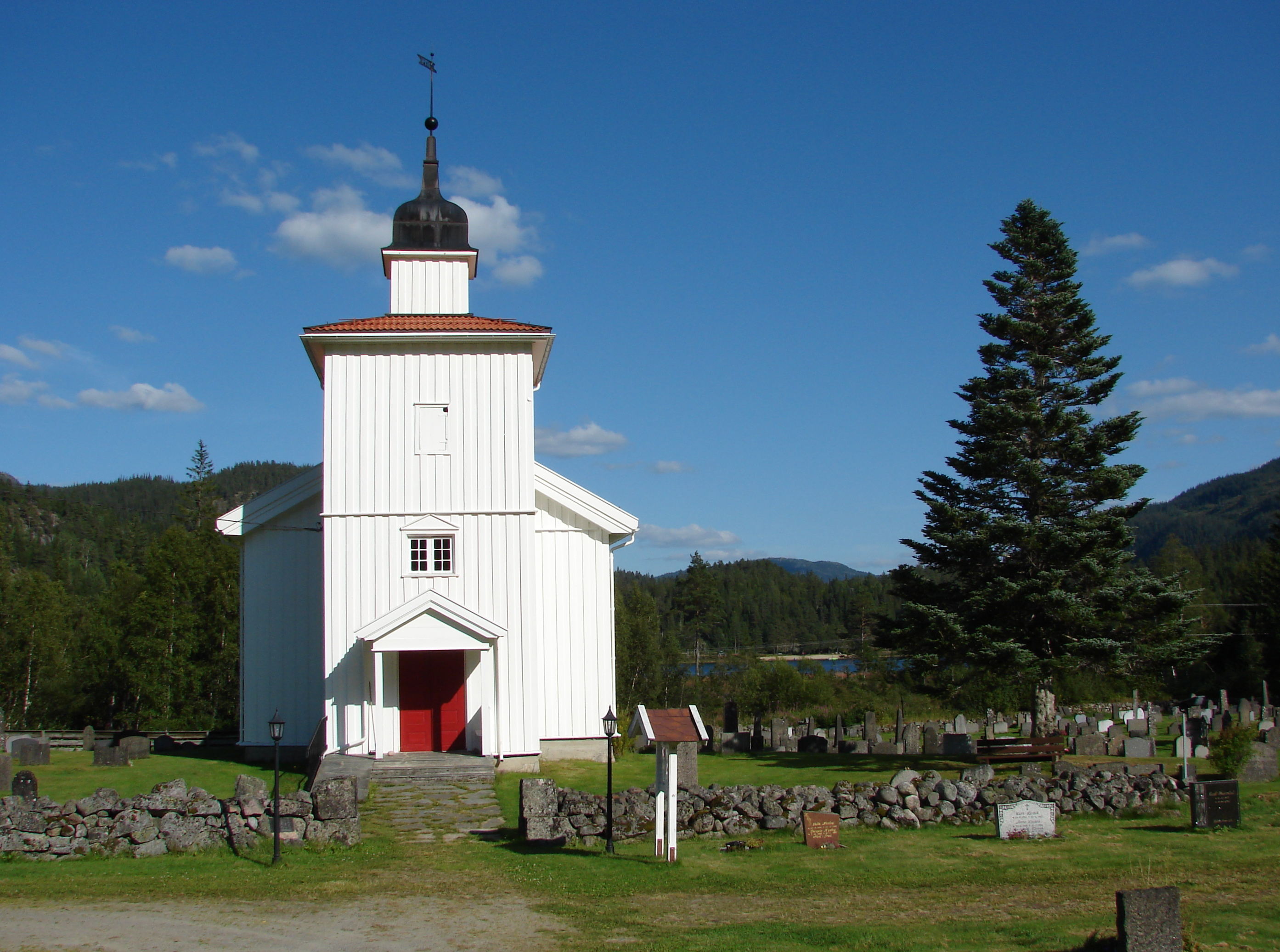
- View of the village church
- Interactive map of Mo
- Coordinates: 59.48366°N 7.84043°E
- Country: Norway
- Region: Eastern Norway
- County: Telemark
- District: Vest-Telemark
- Municipality: Tokke Municipality
- Elevation: 438 m (1,437 ft)
- Time zone: UTC+01:00 (CET)
  - Summer (DST): UTC+02:00 (CEST)
- Post Code: 3880 Dalen

Mo is a village in Tokke Municipality in Telemark county, Norway. The village is located between the lake Mosvatn and Byrtevatn, about 10 kilometres (6.2 mi) west of the village of Dalen. Mo Church is located in the village.
