= Andreas Backer =

Norwegian journalist and editor

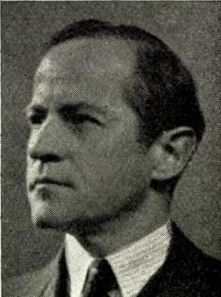
- Andreas Backer, from a 1939 student anniversary book
- Born: 30 May 1895; Mo Municipality, Telemark, Norway
- Died: 10 August 1975 (aged 80); Oslo
- Occupations: journalist, newspaper editor and organizational leader
- Organisation: Norwegian Trekking Association

Andreas Cathrinus Backer (30 May 1895 – 10 August 1975) was a Norwegian journalist, newspaper editor and organizational leader.

== Career ==
Backer was born in Mo Municipality in Telemark county, the son of priest Hans Backer and Johanne Offenberg, and was a brother of Thomas Offenberg Backer. He was a journalist for the newspaper Aftenposten from 1917, and editor of Gjengangeren from 1924. He worked as secretary for the Norwegian Trekking Association from 1927, and was appointed secretary-general from 1945 to 1956. He edited the annals of the organization from 1929 to 1945. Among his publications are Friluftsboka (Free air book) from 1941, Til fjells med Andreas Backer (At the mountains with Andreas Backer) from 1944, and Med beksøm og fiskestang from 1949.

Backer died in Oslo on 10 August 1975, at the age of 80.
