= Skafså Church =

Church in Telemark, Norway

- Skafså kyrkje
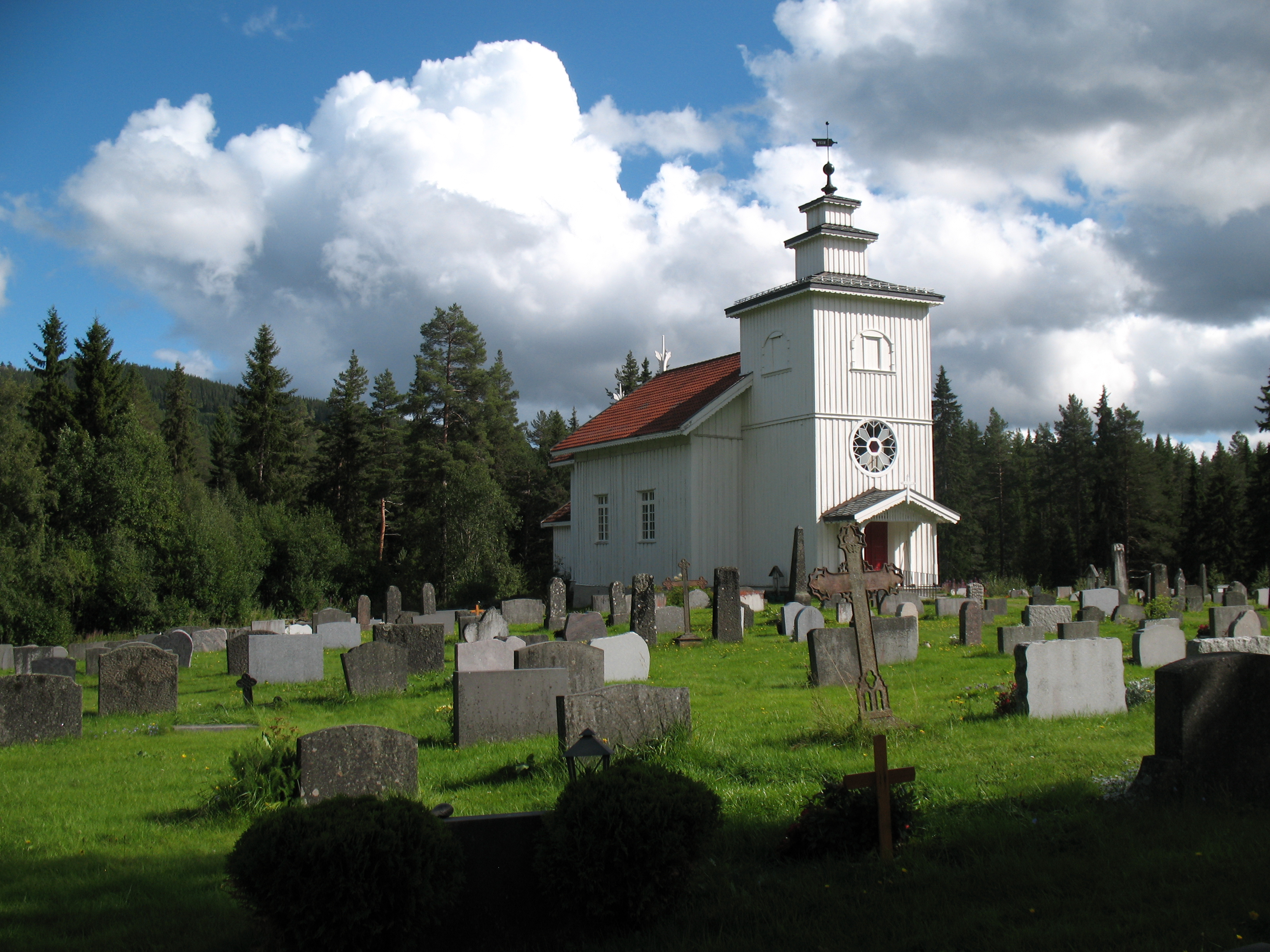
- View of the church
- Skafså Church
- 59°24′30″N 8°00′51″E
- Location: Tokke Municipality, Telemark
- Country: Norway
- Denomination: Church of Norway
- Previous denomination: Catholic Church
- Churchmanship: Evangelical Lutheran

History
- Status: Parish church
- Founded: c. 13th century
- Consecrated: 28 July 1839

Architecture
- Functional status: Active
- Architect: Hans Linstow
- Architectural type: Long church
- Completed: 1839 (187 years ago)

Specifications
- Capacity: 104
- Materials: Wood

Administration
- Diocese: Agder og Telemark
- Deanery: Øvre Telemark prosti
- Parish: Eidsborg, Mo, og Skafså
- Norwegian Cultural Heritage Site
- Type: Church
- Status: Automatically protected
- ID: 85441

Skafså Church (Norwegian: Skafså kyrkje) is a parish church of the Church of Norway in Tokke Municipality in Telemark county, Norway. It is located in the village of Skafså. It is one of the churches for the Eidsborg, Mo, og Skafså parish which is part of the Øvre Telemark prosti (deanery) in the Diocese of Agder og Telemark. The white, wooden church was built in a long church design in 1839 using plans drawn up by the architect Hans Linstow. The church seats about 104 people.

== History ==
The earliest existing historical records of the church date back to the year 1395, but the church was not new that year. The first church in Skafså was a wooden stave church that was built during the 13th century. There is not much known about the church, other than an inspection report from 1668 where it is described as being similar to the nearby Mo Stave Church. The church had open-air corridors around the exterior of the building and it was probably built around a large stave pole in the centre of the building (Nynorsk: Midtmastkyrkje). There are a few pieces that were in the old church that still exist including a crucifix, a table, and a Bible. By the late 1700s, the church was described as being a "distressed" wooden building that was "quite beautiful inside". 1837, the old church was torn down to make room for a new building. It is said that when they took down the large centre mast in the church, it came down with a large crash that could be heard all around the churchyard. After the old church was cleared away, work began on a new church on the same site.

The new church was a wooden long church that was designed by Hans Linstow. The church has a church porch and bell tower on the west end of a rectangular (and rather short) nave. On the east end, there is a rectangular choir. The new building was consecrated on 28 July 1839. During the 1950s, the church was restored and redecorated inside. A builder named Tresland was responsible for the carpentry work as the roof and floor were insulated. The benches were also rebuilt. The church interior was decorated with Biblical motifs by Kristian Kildal. The old altar table from the old stave church was installed in the church during the restoration as well. The church was re-consecrated on 30 August 1959. In 1975–1976, a sacristy was added on the east end of the choir.

== Media gallery ==
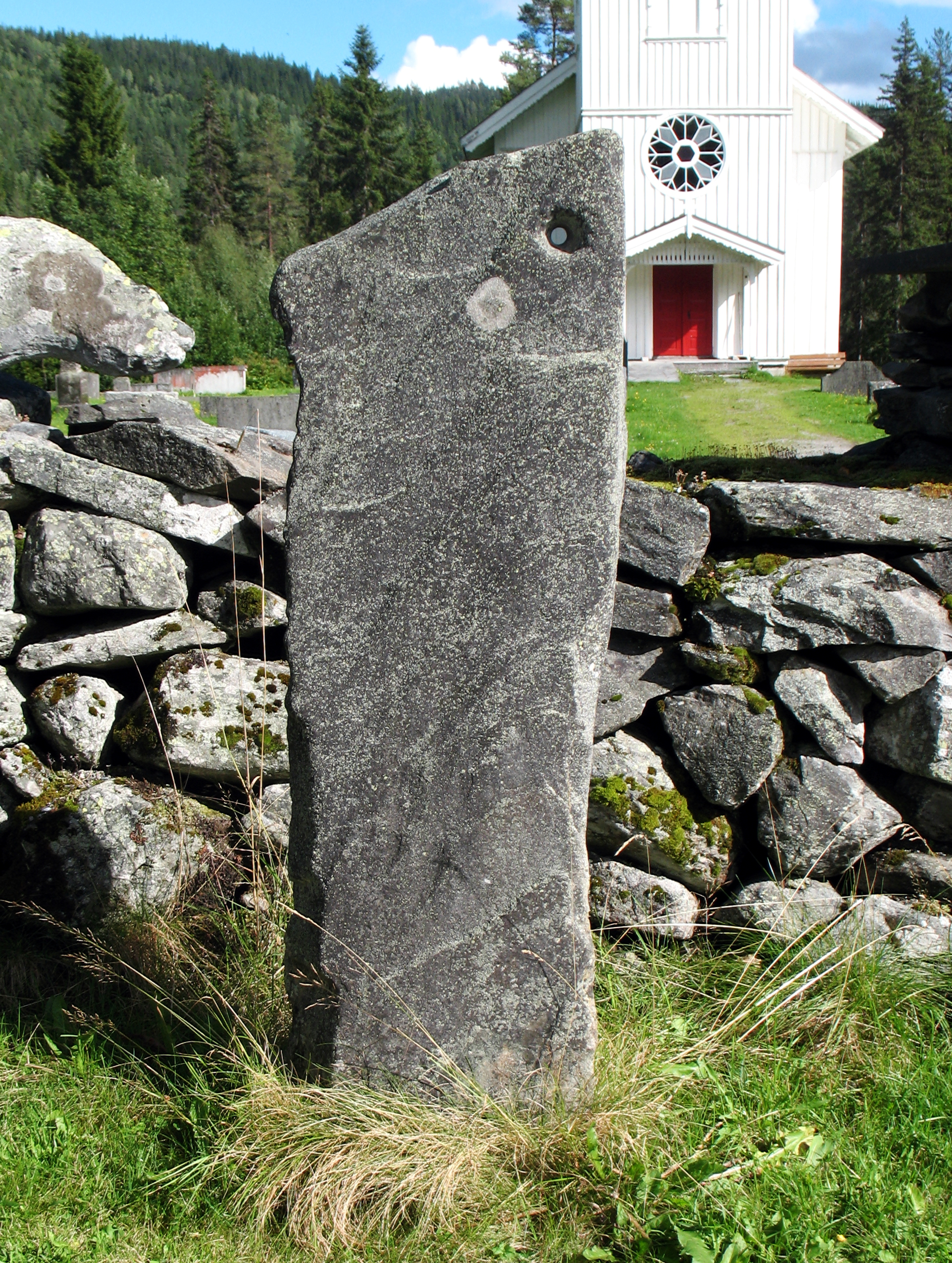

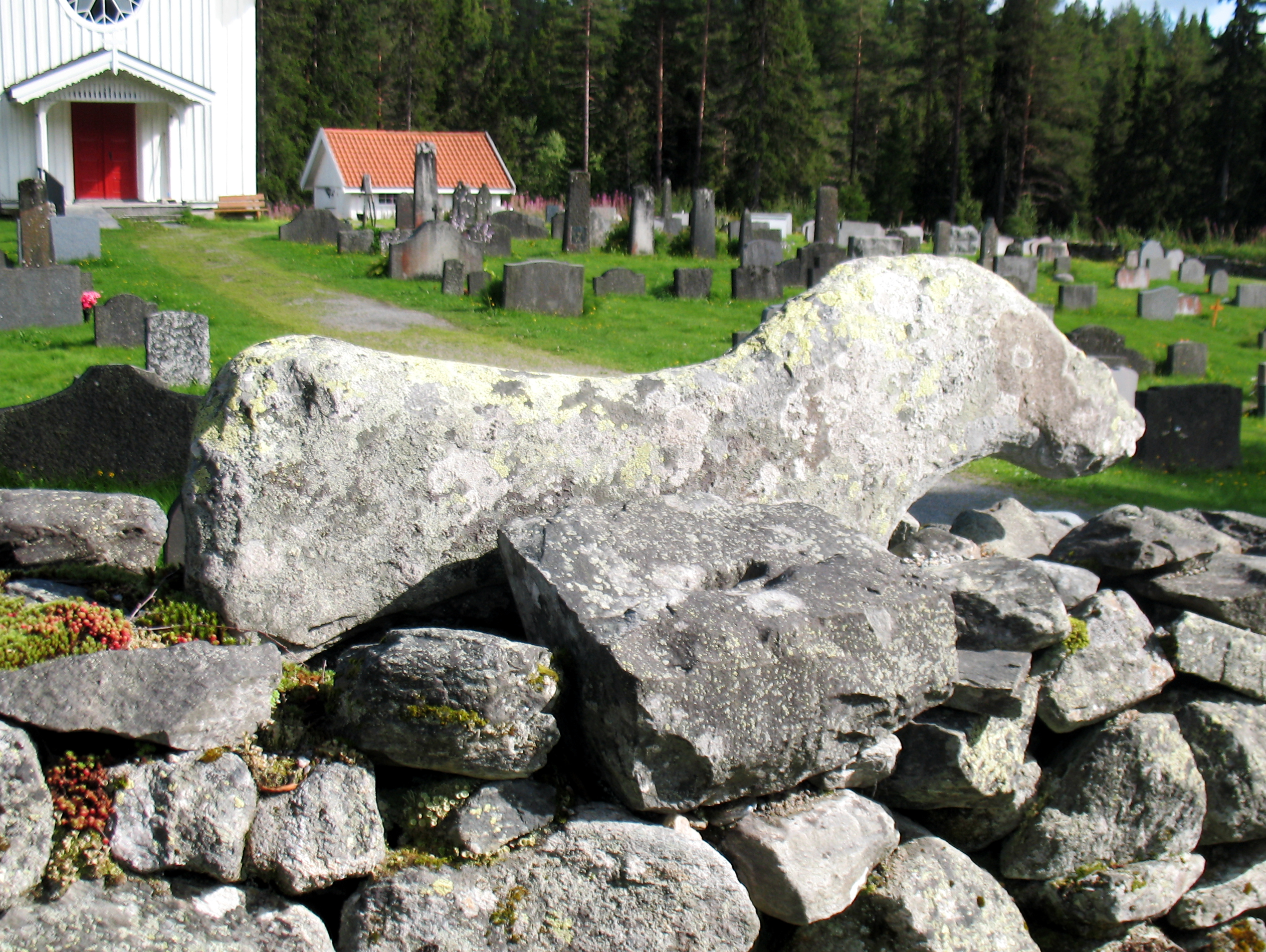

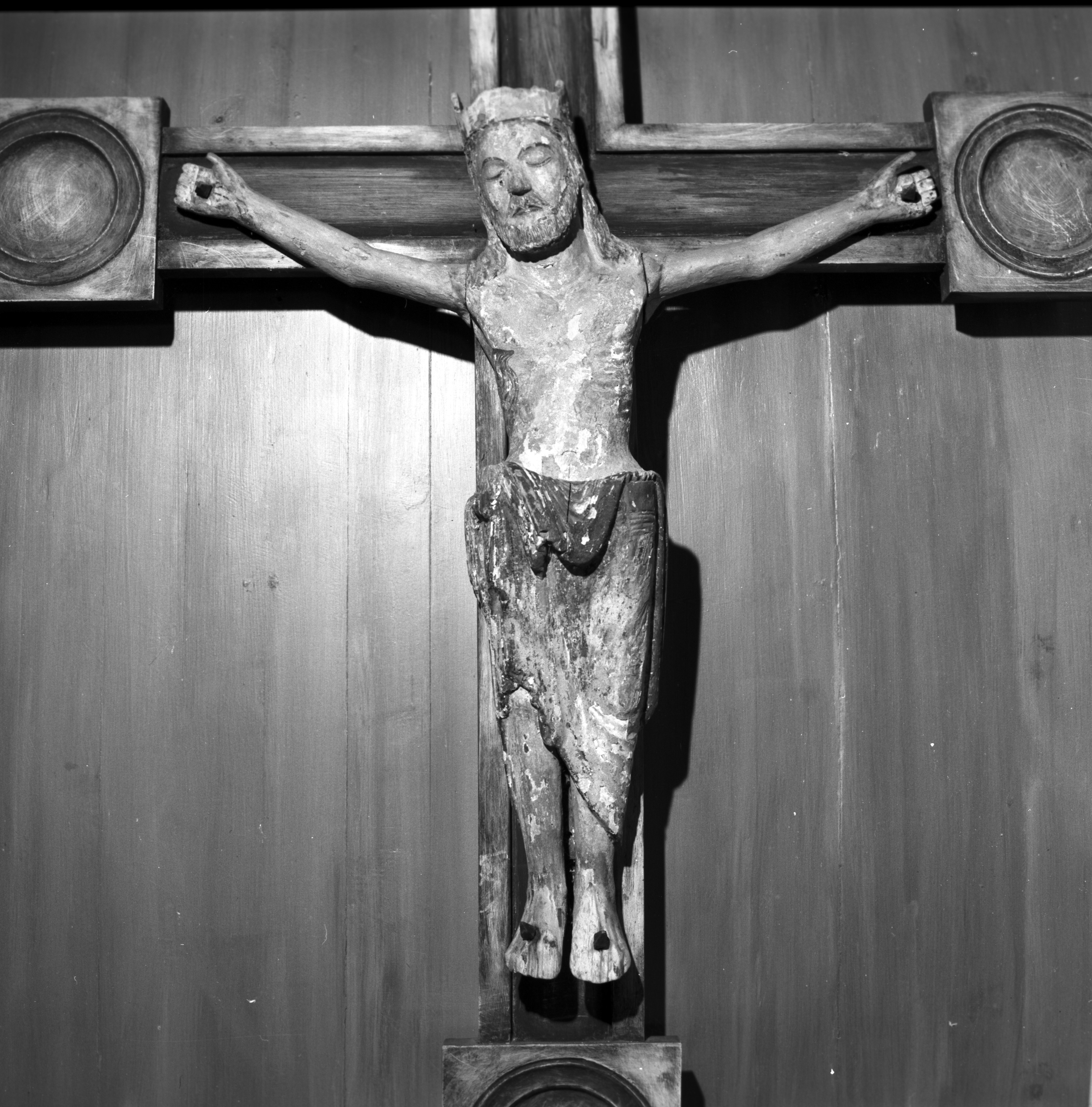
Crucifix from the old Skafså Stave Church

== See also ==
- List of churches in Agder og Telemark
