= Carl Olsen (cyclist) =

Norwegian cyclist

Personal information
- Born: 16 February 1893 Oslo, Norway
- Died: 13 February 1968 (aged 74) Kongsvinger, Norway

Cycling career
- Sport: Cycling

Carl Olsen (16 February 1893 – 13 February 1968) was a Norwegian cyclist. He competed in two events at the 1912 Summer Olympics.
