= Thomas Offenberg Backer =

Norwegian engineer (1892–1987)

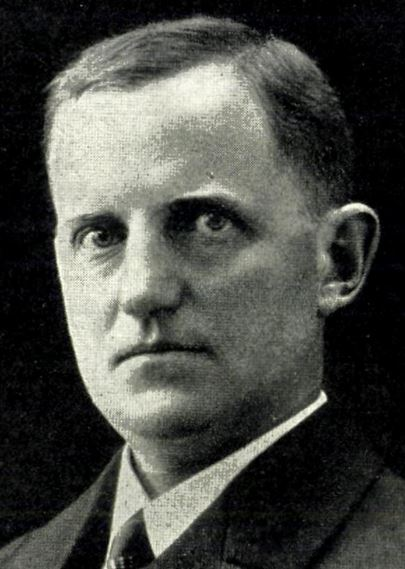
- Born: 27 September 1892
- Died: 10 January 1987 (aged 94)

Thomas Offenberg Backer (27 September 1892 in Telemark Norway – 10 January 1987) was a Norwegian engineer.

== Early life ==
Thomas Offenberg Backer was born at Mo in Telemark, Norway. He was the son of Hans Backer (1858–1940) and Johanne Offenberg (1859–1954). The father was a parish priest. His brother of Andreas Backer was secretary-general for the Norwegian Trekking Association. He was married in 1918 with Clara Martens (1895–1988).

== Career ==
Backer graduated from the Norwegian Institute of Technology as siv.ing. in 1914. From 1948 to 1962 he served as director of the Norwegian Directorate of Public Roads. As a road director, Backer completed the restoration of war damaged bridges and roads resulting during the Nazi occupation of Norway during World War II.

He had formerly worked as a district engineer for the Norwegian Public Roads Administration in Vestfold and in Oppland.

== Private life ==
Backer died during 1987 and was buried at Vestre gravlund in Oslo.

Preceded by Arne Olai Korsbrekke	Director of the Norwegian Directorate of Public Roads; 1948–1962	Succeeded by Karl Olsen
