= Anne Grimdalen =

Norwegian sculptor (1899–1961)

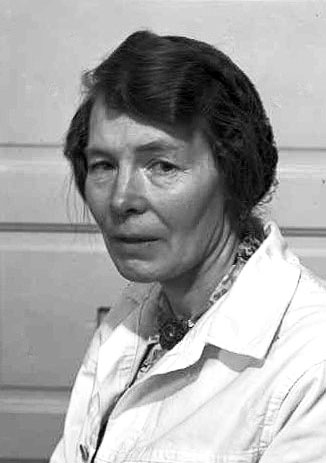
- Anne Grimdalen in 1949
- Born: 1 November 1899; Skafså, Norway
- Died: 3 October 1961 (aged 61)
- Occupation: Sculptor

On the westside wall of Oslo City Hall is Grimdalen's equestrian statue of Harald III of Norway (1950)

Anne Grimdalen (1 November 1899 – 3 October 1961) was a Norwegian sculptor. She was born on the mountain farm Grimdalen in Skafså, Telemark, and later also lived and worked in the so-called Kunstnerdalen in Asker. She worked mainly with granite, and also bronze. She is represented at the National Gallery of Norway, and was one of the main contributors to the decorations of Oslo City Hall.

== Education ==
Grimdalen studied at the Norwegian National Academy of Craft and Art Industry from 1923 to 1926, at the Norwegian National Academy of Fine Arts (1927–1929) under Wilhelm Rasmussen, and in Copenhagen under Einar Utzon-Frank. She made study travels to Italy (1933–34), Greece (1935), Paris and Italy (1938), and London (1947). Two of her inspirators were the painters Henrik Sørensen and Otto Valstad.

== Museum ==
The art museum Grimdalstunet was later (in 1965) built at her home farm Grimdalen in Skafså (now within Tokke Municipality), and contains a collection of more than 250 of her sculptures. The mountain farm itself is also a museum, with buildings from the time of barter economy in the 17th century.

== Works ==
Grimdalen is especially known for her many animal sculptures, made in a simplistic style, often in granite, such as Gaupe (Lynx, 1928), Bjørn (Bear, 1933). She made several contributions to the decoration of Oslo City Hall, after surprisingly winning the decoration contest in 1938, such as Tømmerfløtere (Log drivers) and Dyrefontene (Animal fountain), and the large equestrian statue of Harald III on the west wall (1938–1950). A relief of psalmist Magnus Brostrup Landstad (1951) is placed outside Seljord Church.

Later works are the monuments of Anders Hovden (1958, Ørsta Municipality), Audun Hugleiksson (1959, Jølster Municipality) and Håkon den Gode (1961, Fitjar Municipality). She is represented at the National Gallery of Norway (Jenta på hesten, Riding girl, bronze, 1931).

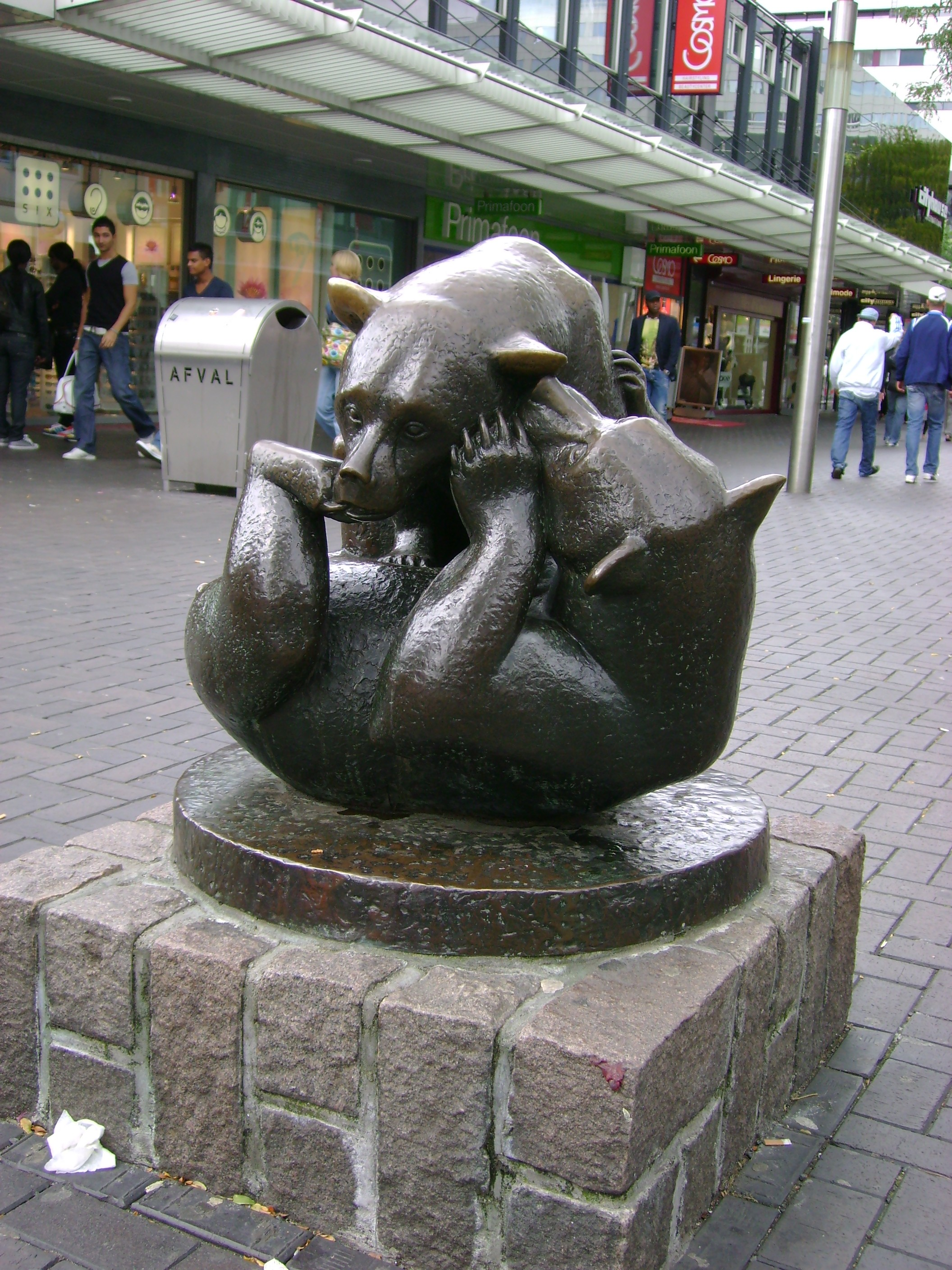
Two small playing bears (1956) Rotterdam
