= Carl B. Olsen =

United States Coast Guard Officer

- Born: May 25, 1904; Fort Collins, Colorado, U.S.
- Died: March 4, 1998 (aged 93); Escambia County, Florida, U.S.
- Education: United States Coast Guard Academy; California Institute of Technology; Naval Postgraduate School
- Military career
- Allegiance: United States
- Branch: United States Coast Guard

Carl Baker Olsen (May 24, 1904, in Fort Collins, Colorado – March 4, 1998, in Escambia County, Florida) was a rear admiral in the United States Coast Guard.

== Biography ==
Olsen was born on May 24, 1904, in Fort Collins, Colorado. He graduated from the California Institute of Technology.

== Career ==
Olsen graduated from the United States Coast Guard Academy in 1928. He was then stationed aboard the USCGC Mendota (WHEC-69), the USRC Seminole and the USS Ericsson (DD-56).

In 1932, Olsen completed aviation training at Naval Air Station Pensacola. From 1934 to 1936, he commanded Coast Guard Air Station Miami. In 1938, Olsen was awarded the Distinguished Flying Cross for flying a critically ill United States Army officer approximately 300 miles during a storm, saving the officer's life. Later, he attended the Naval Postgraduate School.

During World War II, Olsen commanded the Coast Guard Air Station St. Petersburg before serving in the Pacific Theater of Operations. Awards he received for his service during the war include the Asiatic-Pacific Campaign Medal, the American Defense Service Medal, the American Campaign Medal and the World War II Victory Medal.

After the war, he served as Chief of the Aviation Division of the Coast Guard from 1945 to 1946. From there, he served as Commandant of the Cadets at the Coast Guard Academy. Additionally, Olsen commanded the USCGC Eagle (WIX-327).

During the Korean War, Olsen again served as Chief of the Aviation Division. For this, he received the National Defense Service Medal.

Olsen retired from the Coast Guard in 1963.
