= Mo Church (Tokke) =

Church in Telemark, Norway

- Mo kyrkje
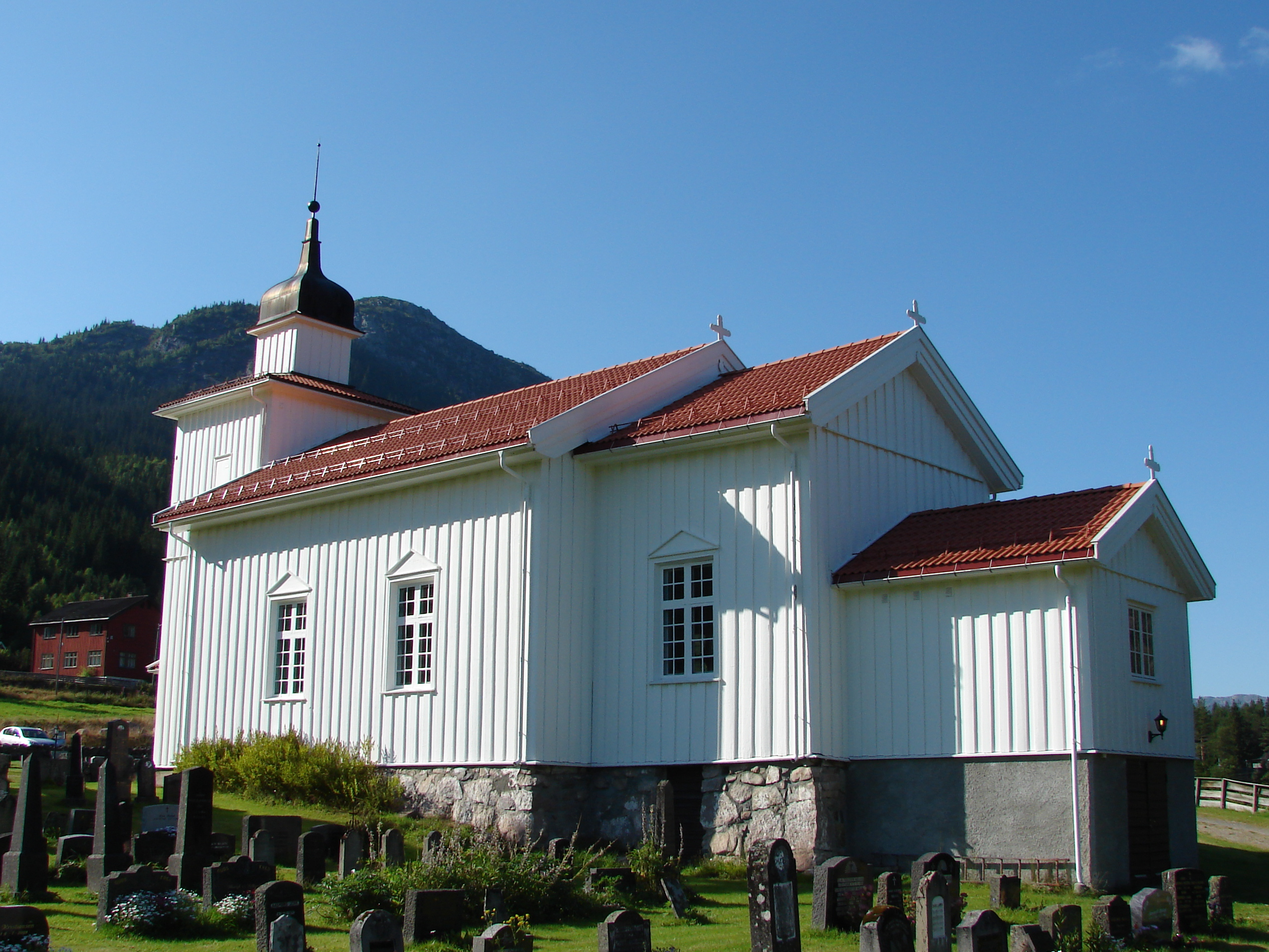
- View of the church
- Mo Church
- 59°28′44″N 7°50′47″E
- Location: Tokke Municipality, Telemark
- Country: Norway
- Denomination: Church of Norway
- Previous denomination: Catholic Church
- Churchmanship: Evangelical Lutheran

History
- Status: Parish church
- Founded: 13th century
- Consecrated: 1839

Architecture
- Functional status: Active
- Architect: Hans Linstow
- Architectural type: Long church
- Completed: 1839 (187 years ago)

Specifications
- Capacity: 132
- Materials: Wood

Administration
- Diocese: Agder og Telemark
- Deanery: Øvre Telemark prosti
- Parish: Eidsborg, Mo, og Skafså
- Norwegian Cultural Heritage Site
- Type: Church
- Status: Automatically protected
- ID: 84961

Mo Church (Norwegian: Mo kyrkje) is a parish church of the Church of Norway in Tokke Municipality in Telemark county, Norway. It is located in the village of Mo. It is one of the churches for the Eidsborg, Mo, og Skafså parish which is part of the Øvre Telemark prosti (deanery) in the Diocese of Agder og Telemark. The white, wooden church was built in a long church design in 1839 using plans drawn up by the architect Hans Linstow. The church seats about 132 people.

== History ==
The earliest existing historical records of the church date back to the year 1342, but the church was not built that year. The first church in Mo was a wooden stave church that was built during the 13th century. There is not much known about the church, other than an inspection report from 1668 where it is described as having several exterior support beams holding up the walls. It also said that the floor of the chancel was raised about 3 alen or 1.9 metres (6 ft 3 in) above the floor of the nave. During the 1700s, the church was renovated and modernized somewhat.

In 1814, this church served as an election church (Norwegian: valgkirke). Together with more than 300 other parish churches across Norway, it was a polling station for elections to the 1814 Norwegian Constituent Assembly which wrote the Constitution of Norway. This was Norway's first national elections. Each church parish was a constituency that elected people called "electors" who later met together in each county to elect the representatives for the assembly that was to meet at Eidsvoll Manor later that year.

In 1837, the old church was torn down to make room for a new building. After the old church was cleared away, work began on a new church on the same site. The new church was a wooden long church that was designed by Hans Linstow. The church has a church porch and bell tower on the west end of a rectangular nave. On the east end, there is a rectangular choir. The new building was consecrated in December 1839. During the late-1950s, the church was restored and redecorated inside. A builder named Tresland was responsible for the carpentry work and Finn Krafft and Harald Kihle were design consultants. The old altarpiece which had been in the old stave church prior to the 1830s, was installed in this church during the renovation. Also, the pulpit was lowered during this project. The newly restored church was re-consecrated on 20 August 1961. In 1975–1976, a sacristy was built on the east end of the church. The church tower was repaired in 1983.

== Media gallery ==
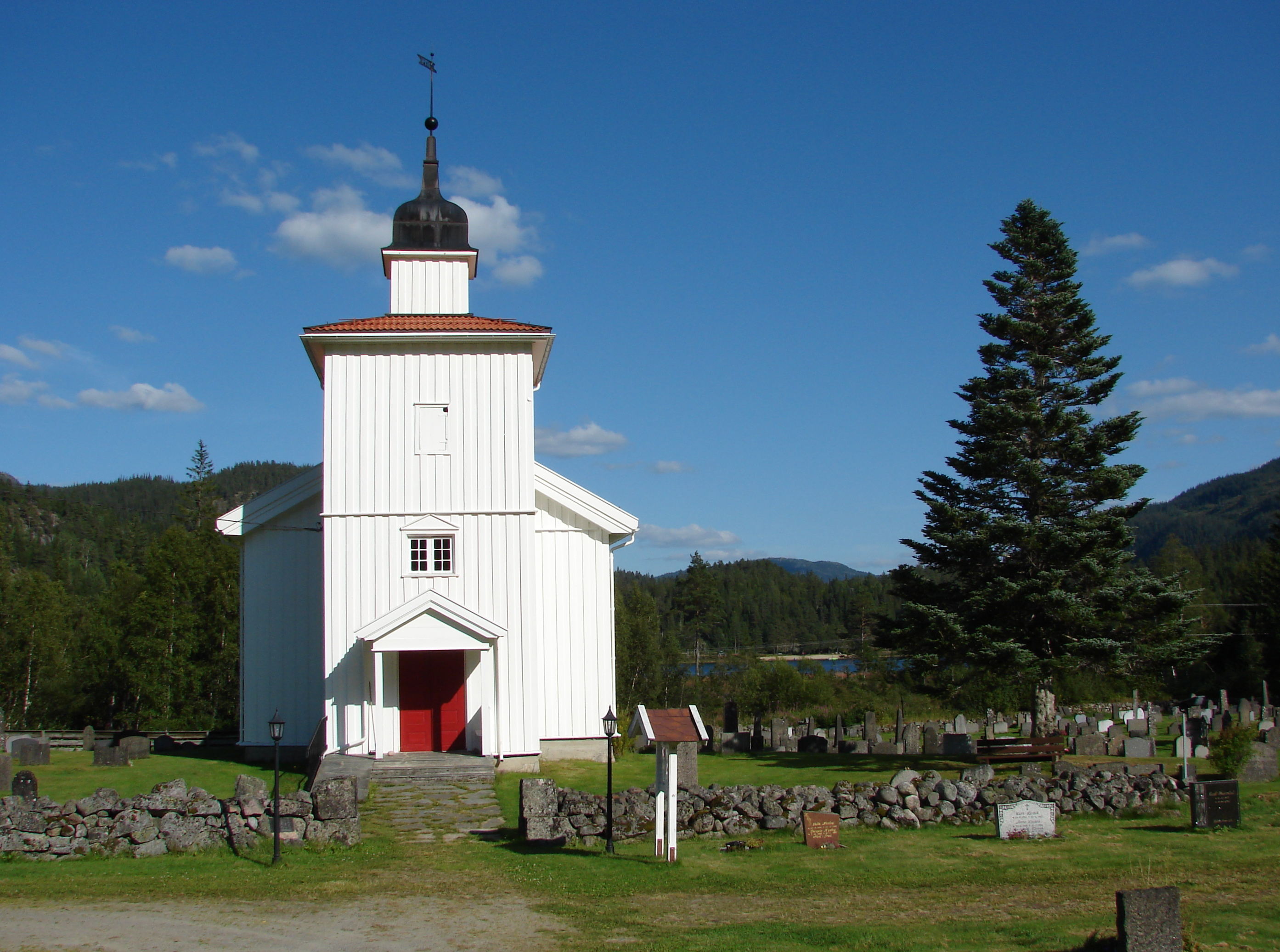
Front view of the church

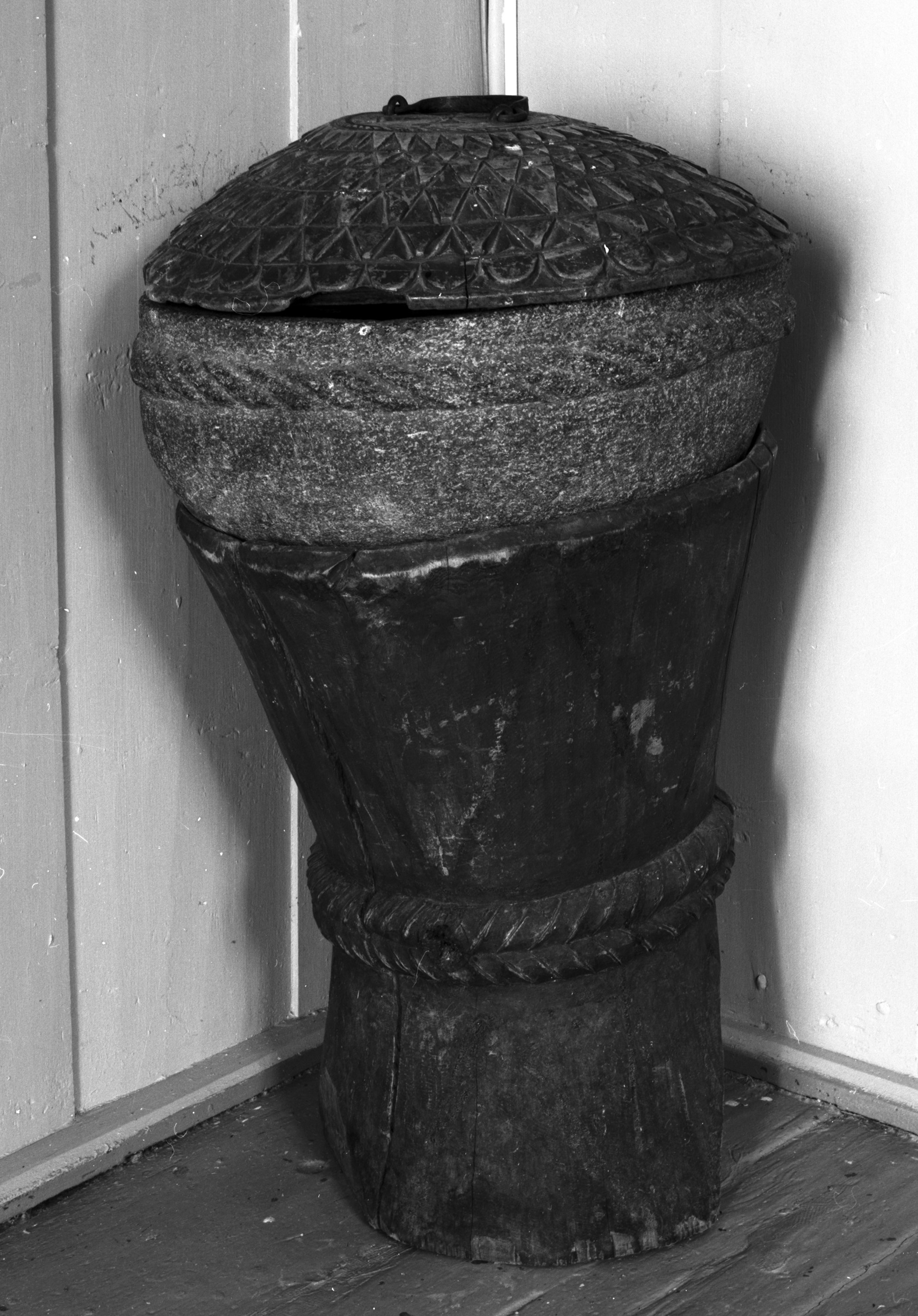
Baptismal font

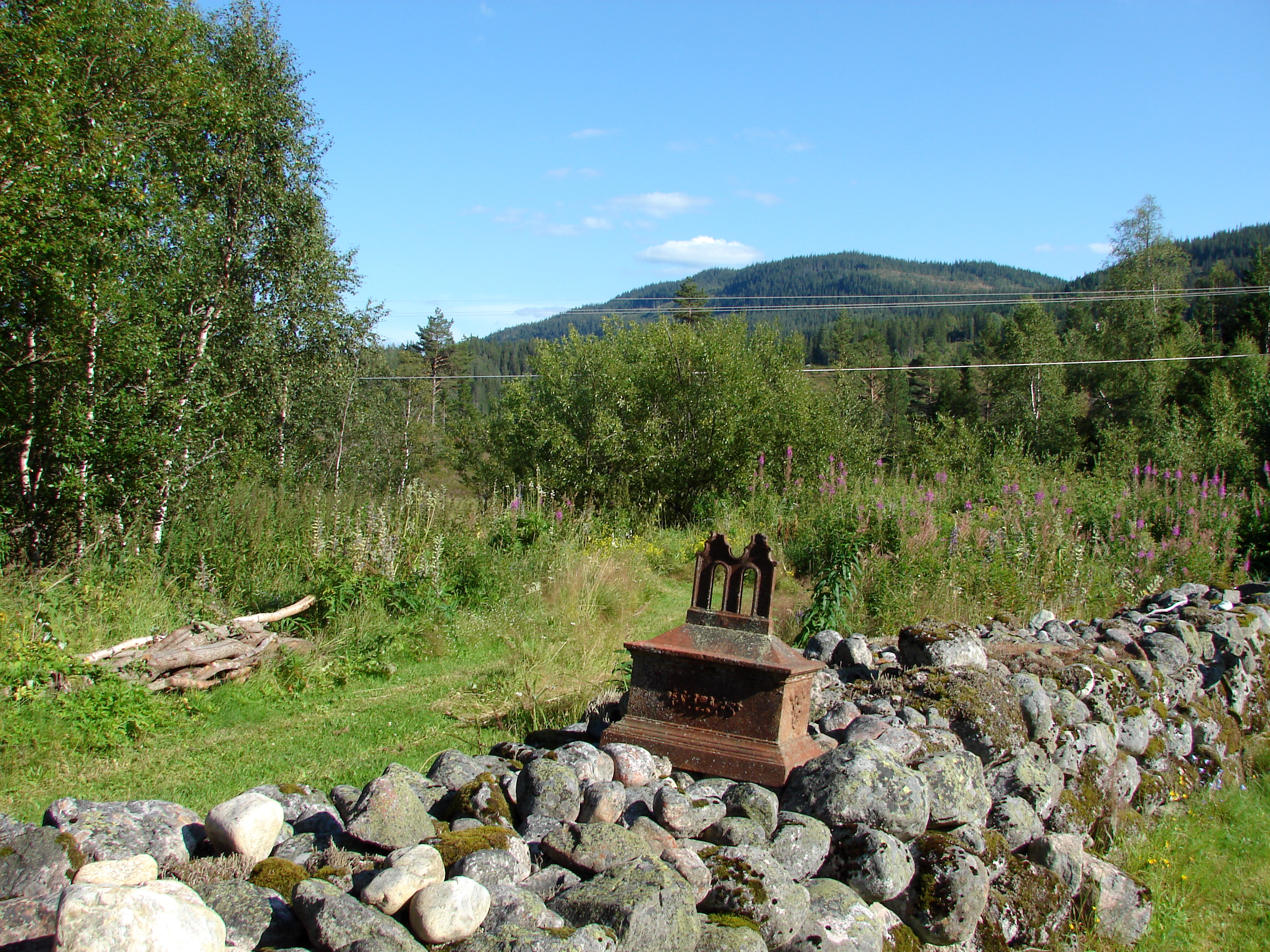
Church yard

== See also ==
- List of churches in Agder og Telemark
