= Karl Olsen =

Norwegian civil servant

Karl Olsen (27 December 1910 – 21 February 1999) was a Norwegian civil servant.

== Early life ==
He was born in Farsund, and graduated as siv.ing. from the Norwegian Institute of Technology.

== Career ==
From 1962 to 1980 he served as director of the Norwegian Directorate of Public Roads. Before this he worked in the administration of Bærum municipality. From 1952 to 1956 he was president of the Norwegian Association of Civil Engineers, an organization now known as Tekna.

== Private life ==
He resided at Høvik. He died in February 1999 in Bærum.

Government offices
Preceded by Thomas Offenberg Backer	Director of the Norwegian Directorate of Public Roads; 1962–1980	Succeeded by Eskild Jensen
