= Byrtevatn =

Lake in Telemark, Norway

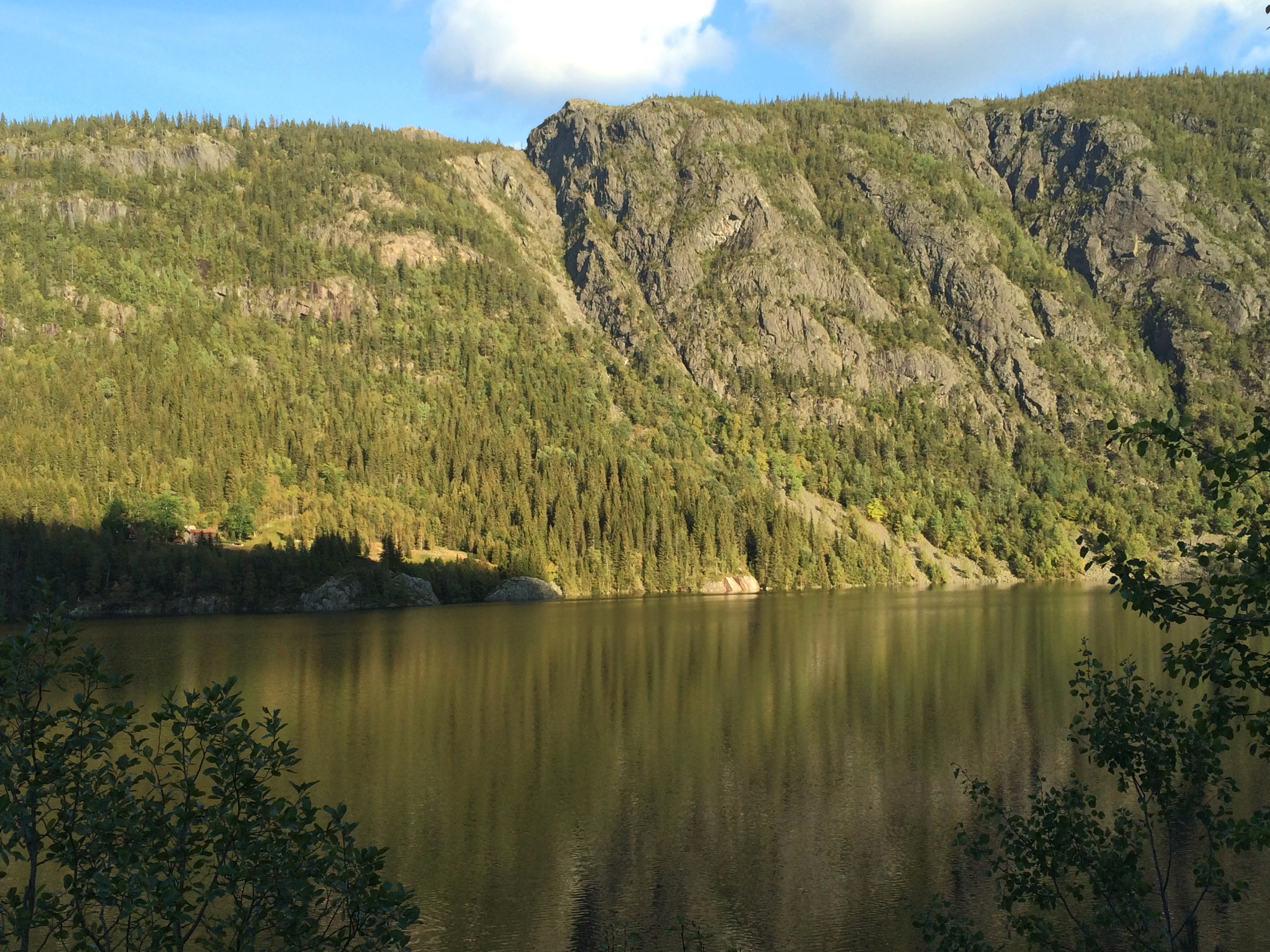
- Interactive map of Byrtevatn
- Location: Tokke Municipality, Telemark
- Coordinates: 59.54845°N 7.82343°E
- Catchment area: 100 km^{2} (39 sq mi)
- Basin countries: Norway
- Max. length: 9.6 kilometres (6.0 mi)
- Max. width: 1 kilometre (0.62 mi)
- Surface area: 4.8 km^{2} (1.9 sq mi)
- Max. depth: 94 metres (308 ft)
- Water volume: 0.1682 km^{3} (136,400 acre⋅ft)
- Surface elevation: 446 metres (1,463 ft)
- References: NVE

Byrtevatn is a lake in Tokke Municipality in Telemark county, Norway. The 4.8-square-kilometre (1.9 sq mi) lake is located about 10 kilometres (6.2 mi) northwest of the village of Dalen. The main natural influx comes from the river Byrteåi. Byrtevatn has a dam on the south end of the lake which regulates the surface elevation of the lake. Water from the nearby lake Botnedalsvatn flows through a tunnel into the Byrte Hydroelectric Power Station and the water is then released into this lake.

== See also ==
- List of lakes of Norway
