= Vest-Telemark =

District in Telemark, Norway

Vest-Telemark Øvre Telemark vestfjelske (historic)
- District
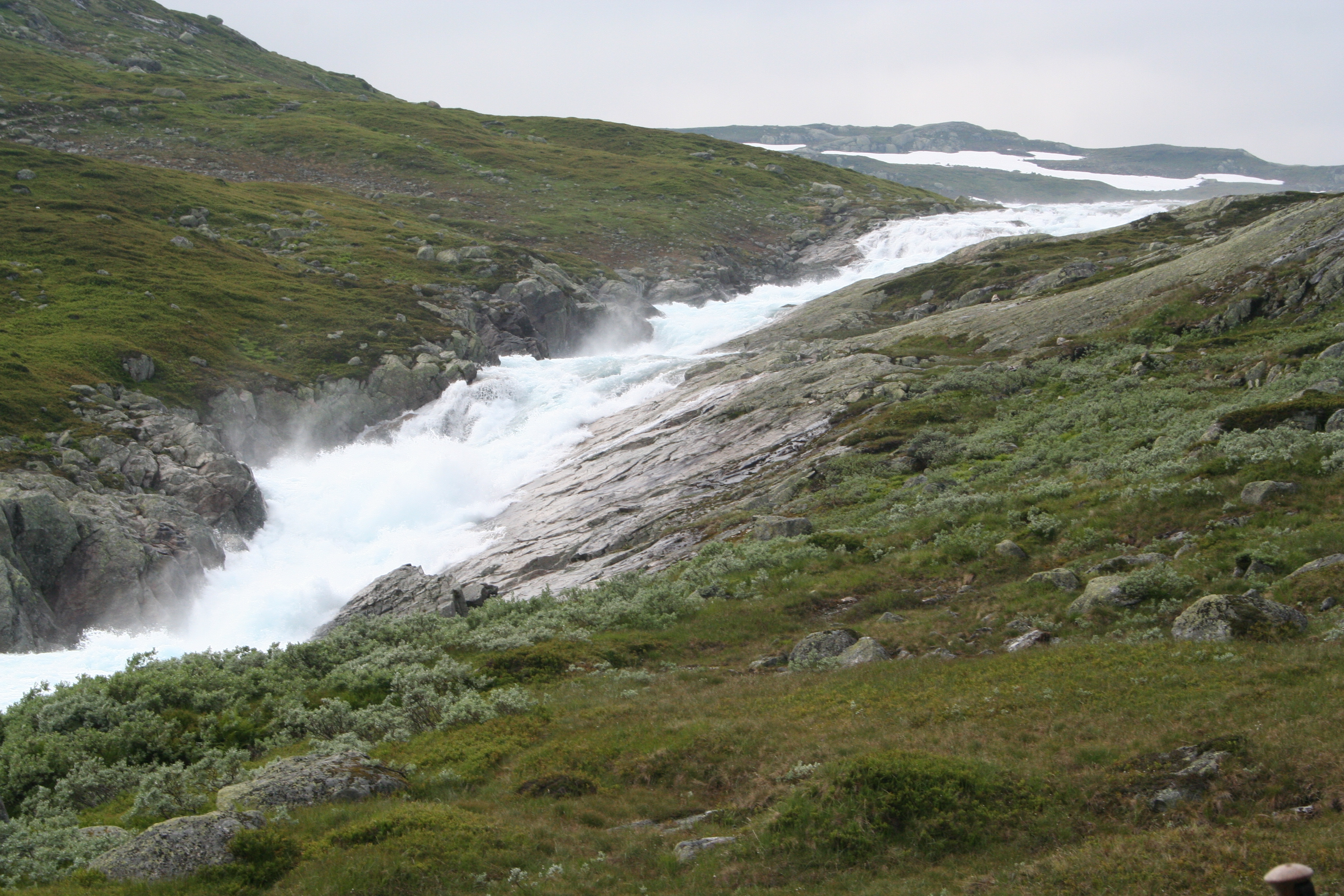
- The river Bora in Vinje Municipality on the border with Vestland county

- Coordinates: 59.4653°N 8.0200°E
- Country: Norway
- County: Telemark
- Region: Østlandet

Area
  - Total: 7,699 km^{2} (2,973 sq mi)

Population (2020)
  - Total: 13,903
  - Density: 1.806/km^{2} (4.677/sq mi)
- Demonym(s): Teledøl; Telemarking

Vest-Telemark (lit. 'West-Telemark') is a traditional district in Norway. The 7,699-square-kilometre (2,973 sq mi) area comprises the western areas of the larger region known as Upper Telemark (Norwegian: Øvre Telemark) in Telemark county. The region consists of six municipalities: Fyresdal, Tokke, Vinje, Nissedal, Kviteseid, and Seljord. In 2020, there were 13,903 residents in the region. The area of Vest-Telemark was historically called Øvre Telemark vestfjelske.

The region is known for its folk traditions within music, clothing, handcrafts, food, and architecture. The region is also distinctly marked by its dialects of Norwegian. This form of Norwegian is among those containing the most traces of the Old Norse language and grammar. This area uses the Nynorsk written form of Norwegian.

Vest-Telemark is also the home of slalom (slalåm) skiing, Telemark skiing, and ski jumping (with its characteristic Telemark landing). "The Cradle of Modern Skiing" is found in Morgedal.

== Municipalities ==
Name	Population (in 2020)	Language form	Website
Fyresdal Municipality	1,287	Nynorsk	Fyresdal.kommune.no
Kviteseid Municipality	2,403	Nynorsk	Kviteseid.kommune.no
Nissedal Municipality	1,448	Nynorsk	Nissedal.kommune.no
Seljord Municipality	2,888	Nynorsk	Seljord.kommune.no
Tokke Municipality	2,201	Nynorsk	Tokke.kommune.no
Vinje Municipality	3,676	Nynorsk	Vinje.kommune.no

== Demographics ==
Historical population

Year	Pop.	±%
1951	16,375	—
1960	17,037	+4.0%
1970	15,846	−7.0%
1980	15,746	−0.6%

Year	Pop.	±%
1990	15,706	−0.3%
2000	14,770	−6.0%
2010	14,251	−3.5%
2020	13,903	−2.4%

Source: Statistics Norway

== Notable people from Vest-Telemark ==
- Aslaug Vaa, author from Rauland in Vinje Municipality
- Vidkun Quisling, politician from Fyresdal Municipality
- Aasmund Olavsson Vinje, author from Vinje Municipality
- Tarjei Vesaas, author from Vinje Municipality
- Odd Nordstoga, musician from Vinje Municipality
- Sondre Norheim, skier from Morgedal in Kviteseid Municipality
- Ivar Peterson Tveiten, politician from Fyresdal Municipality
- Anne Grimdalen, sculptor from Skafså in Tokke Municipality
- Eivind Groven, composer from Lårdal in Tokke Municipality
- Dyre Vaa, sculptor from Rauland in Vinje Municipality
- Halldis Moren Vesaas, author from Vinje Municipality
- Terje Haakonsen, snowboarder from Vinje Municipality
- Sven Erik Kristiansen, musician from Rauland in Vinje Municipality
