= Rauland =

Rauland may refer to:

== Places ==
- Rauland Municipality, a former municipality in Telemark county, Norway
- Rauland or Raulandsgrend, a village in Vinje Municipality in Telemark county, Norway
- Rauland Church, a church in Vinje Municipality in Telemark county, Norway
- Rauland prestegjeld, a former geographic subdivision of the Church of Norway

== Other ==
- Rauland-Borg, an American-owned manufacturing company
- Scott Rauland, an American diplomat
