= Arabygdi =

Village in Vinje Municipality, Norway

- Village
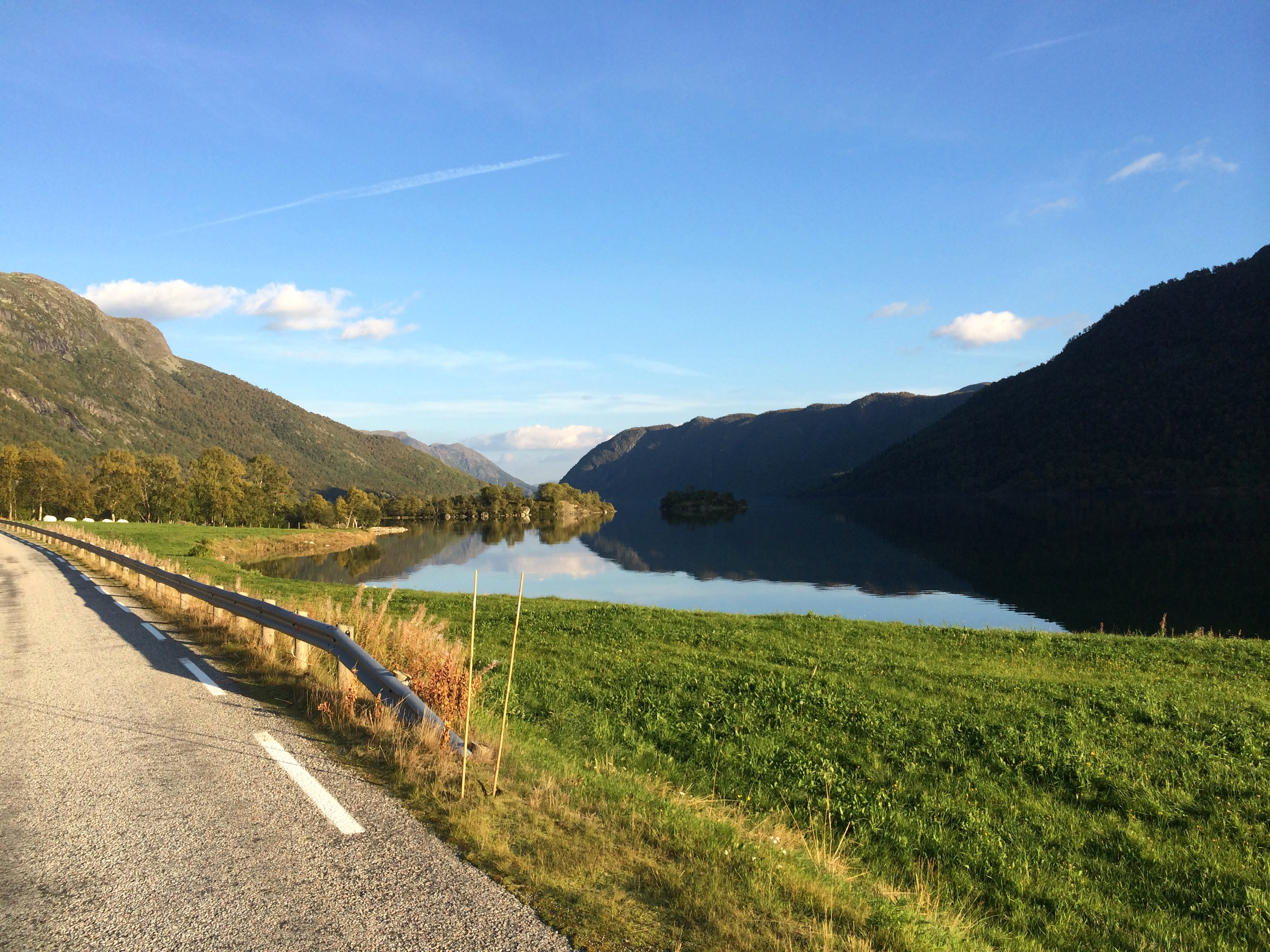
- View of the landscape near the village
- Interactive map of Arabygdi
- Coordinates: 59.77528°N 7.72843°E
- Country: Norway
- Region: Eastern Norway
- County: Telemark
- District: Vest-Telemark
- Municipality: Vinje Municipality
- Elevation: 699 m (2,293 ft)
- Time zone: UTC+01:00 (CET)
  - Summer (DST): UTC+02:00 (CEST)
- Post Code: 3864 Rauland

Arabygdi is a village in Vinje Municipality in Telemark county, Norway. The village is located at the western end of the lake Totak. The Norwegian County Road 362 passes through the village, connecting it to the villages of Haukeli (to the west) and Raulandsgrend (to the east). The road passes through the Urdbøuri scree area, just west of Arabygdi.

== History ==
The region around Arabygdi has been inhabited for centuries, with evidence of traditional farming communities that have shaped its cultural landscape.

A pivotal figure in Arabygdi's history is Torgeir Augundsson, affectionately known as Myllarguten. Born in 1801, he became a prominent folk musician celebrated for his virtuosity on the Hardanger fiddle. His home, Myllarheimen, has been preserved as a museum and stands as a testament to his legacy. The museum offers visitors insight into the life and work of Myllarguten, showcasing the rich musical traditions of the region.

Arabygdi's commitment to preserving its cultural heritage is also evident in the maintenance of traditional structures and the promotion of local history. The village is part of the larger efforts of Vinje Municipality to celebrate and sustain the region's unique cultural identity.
