= Håvard Gibøen =

Norwegian fiddler and composer

- Born: 2 March 1809; Møsstrond, Norway
- Died: 27 July 1873 (aged 64)
- Occupations: fiddler and composer

Håvard Gibøen (2 March 1809 – 27 July 1873) was a Norwegian fiddler and composer, born in Møsstrond in Rauland prestegjeld in Telemark. The area is a part of Vinje Municipality today. Among his folk tunes are "Haavard Gibøens draum ved Oterholtsbrue" and "Gibøens bruremarsj". These tunes formed the basis for two compositions by Edvard Grieg, included in his opus 72, Slåtter.

== Life ==
Håvard Gibøen came from a gifted family, and his father, Knut Gibøen, also played the fiddle. His mother, Åsne, was related to the Berge family from Rauland, to whom many other folk musicians were connected. Like his contemporary Myllarguten, he was taught by the known fiddler Knut Lurås from Tinn.

Håvard was of small stature, and played in weddings and at feasts from early on. In his early years, he was so tiny he had to sit on a barrel, placed on a table, to be seen and heard. Unlike Myllarguten, he never left his home area, and hardly travelled farther than Kongsberg. He lived his whole life on his mountain farm, and eventually died there in 1873. His son, Kjetil, and his grandsons after him, were fiddlers in the same tradition - carried on to this very day.

== Musical style ==
As Myllarguten was known for his improvisations and reshaping of tradition, Håvard was "traditional", and kept his fiddle tunes unchanged. Thus, he became a valuable source for an older tradition. Håvard was reckoned to be introvert, and preferred more melancholic tunes. His tonality, which was passed on after him, was old-fashioned, even "medieval" to some extent. His musical style were preserved, not only by his sons, but also by the fiddler Knut Dahle and his grandsons in Tinn.

In Telemark, it is common knowledge that the tradition of Håvard survived in the eastern parts, Tinn and Tuddal, while the tradition of Myllarguten was preserved in the west: Rauland and Vinje. The two traditions tend to meet at Bø.
