= Luraas =

Luraas is a surname. Notable people with the surname include:

- Knut Luraas (1782–1843), Norwegian Hardingfele fiddler and artist
- Thomas Luraas (1799–1886), Norwegian rose painter and clarinetist, brother of Knut
