= Rauland Municipality =

Former municipality in Telemark, Norway

Rauland Municipality Rauland herad
- Former municipality
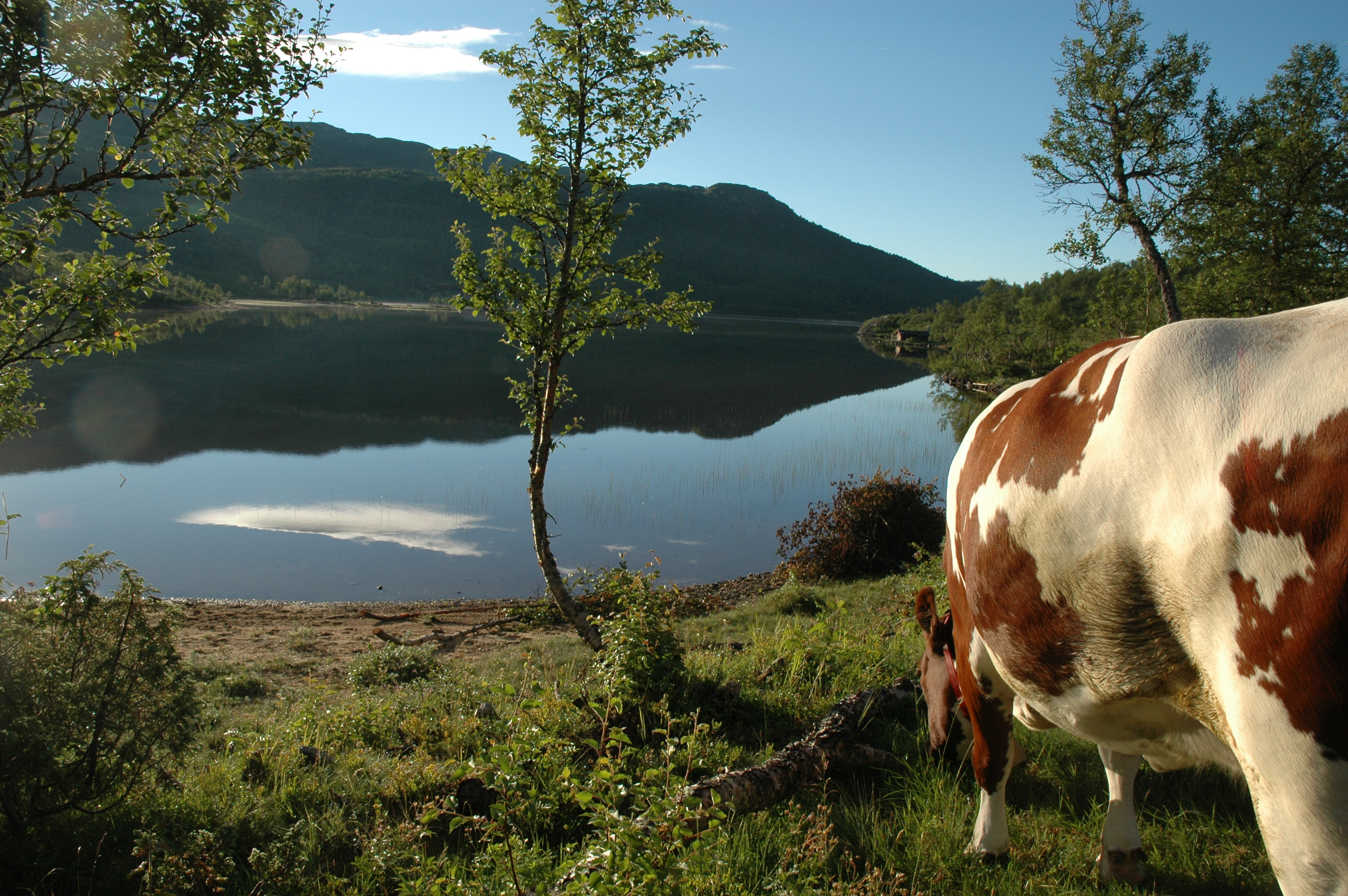
- Rural area in Rauland

- Telemark within Norway

- Rauland within Telemark
- Coordinates: 59°42′59″N 7°59′18″E
- Country: Norway
- County: Telemark
- District: Vest-Telemark
- Established: 1860
  - Preceded by: Vinje Municipality and Laardal Municipality
- Disestablished: 1 Jan 1964
  - Succeeded by: Vinje Municipality
- Administrative centre: Raulandsgrend

Government
  - Mayor (1959–1963): Tarjei Kramviken (Ap)

Area (upon dissolution)
  - Total: 1,830.4 km^{2} (706.7 sq mi)
  - Rank: #28 in Norway
- Highest elevation: 1,630 m (5,350 ft)

Population (1963)
  - Total: 1,624
  - Rank: #512 in Norway
  - Density: 0.9/km^{2} (2.3/sq mi)
  - Change (10 years): ▲ +10.9%
- Demonym: Raulending

Official language
  - Norwegian form: Nynorsk
- Time zone: UTC+01:00 (CET)
  - Summer (DST): UTC+02:00 (CEST)
- ISO 3166 code: NO-0835

Rauland (Norwegian pronunciation: [ˈrɑʉlɑn]; locally [ˈrœʊlɑn]) is a former municipality in Telemark county, Norway. The 1,830.4-square-kilometre (706.7 sq mi) municipality existed from 1860 until its dissolution in 1964. The area is now part of Vinje Municipality in the traditional district of Øvre Telemark. The administrative centre was the village of Raulandsgrend (also known as Rauland) which is where Rauland Church is located.

Prior to its dissolution in 1964, the 1,830.4-square-kilometre (706.7 sq mi) municipality was the 28th largest by area out of the 689 municipalities in Norway. Rauland Municipality was the 512th most populous municipality in Norway with a population of about 1,624. The municipality's population density was 0.9 inhabitants per square kilometre (2.3/sq mi) and its population had increased by 10.9% over the previous 10-year period.

== General information ==
=== Administrative history ===
Rauland Municipality was established in 1860 when the following areas were merged: the northeastern district of Vinje Municipality (population: 745) and the Øyfjell area of Laurdal Municipality (population: 243).

During the 1960s, there were many municipal mergers across Norway due to the work of the Schei Committee. On 1 January 1964, Rauland Municipality (population: 1,656) was dissolved and merged with Vinje Municipality (population: 2,565) to form an enlarged Vinje Municipality.

=== Name ===
The municipality is named after the old Rauland prestegjeld. The prestegjeld was named after the old Rauland farm (Old Norse: Rauðaland) since the first Rauland Church was built there. The first element is rauði which means "bog iron". The last element is land which means "land" or "district". The many marshlands in the area are filled with bog iron and for centuries its production was an important local resource.

=== Churches ===
The Church of Norway had three parishes (sokn) within Rauland Municipality. At the time of the municipal dissolution, it was part of the Rauland prestegjeld and the Vest-Telemark prosti (deanery) in the Diocese of Agder.

Churches in Rauland Municipality
| Parish (sokn) | Church name | Location of the church | Year built |
|---|---|---|---|
| Rauland | Rauland Church | Raulandsgrend | 1803 |
| Møsstrond | Møsstrond Church | Møsstrond | 1923 |
| Øyfjell | Øyfjell Church | Øyfjell | 1833 |

== Geography ==
The municipality was a very mountainous, rural area, with about 90% of its area at elevations of 900 metres (3,000 ft) above sea level or higher. The highest point in the municipality was the 1,630-metre (5,350 ft) tall mountain Fliseggi. Ullensvang Municipality (in Hordaland county) was located to the northwest, Nore og Uvdal Municipality (in Buskerud county) was located to the north, Tinn Municipality was located to the east, Seljord Municipality was located to the southeast, Lårdal Municipality was located to the south, and Vinje Municipality was located to the west.

== Government ==
While it existed, Rauland Municipality was responsible for primary education (through 10th grade), outpatient health services, senior citizen services, welfare and other social services, zoning, economic development, and municipal roads and utilities. The municipality was governed by a municipal council of directly elected representatives. The mayor was indirectly elected by a vote of the municipal council. The municipality was under the jurisdiction of the Vest-Telemark District Court and the Agder Court of Appeal.

=== Municipal council ===
The municipal council (Heradsstyre) of Rauland Municipality was made up of 21 representatives that were elected to four year terms. The tables below show the historical composition of the council by political party.

Rauland heradsstyre 1959–1963
| Party name (in Nynorsk) | Number of representatives |
|---|---|
| Labour Party (Arbeidarpartiet) | 13 |
| Centre Party (Senterpartiet) | 4 |
| Joint List(s) of Non-Socialist Parties (Borgarlege Felleslister) | 4 |
| Total number of members: | 21 |
Note: On 1 January 1964, Rauland Municipality became part of Vinje Municipality.

Rauland heradsstyre 1955–1959
| Party name (in Nynorsk) | Number of representatives |
|---|---|
| Labour Party (Arbeidarpartiet) | 13 |
| Joint List(s) of Non-Socialist Parties (Borgarlege Felleslister) | 8 |
| Total number of members: | 21 |

Rauland heradsstyre 1951–1955
| Party name (in Nynorsk) | Number of representatives |
|---|---|
| Labour Party (Arbeidarpartiet) | 12 |
| Joint List(s) of Non-Socialist Parties (Borgarlege Felleslister) | 8 |
| Total number of members: | 20 |

Rauland heradsstyre 1947–1951
| Party name (in Nynorsk) | Number of representatives |
|---|---|
| Labour Party (Arbeidarpartiet) | 8 |
| Joint list of the Liberal Party (Venstre) and the Radical People's Party (Radikale Folkepartiet) | 1 |
| Local List(s) (Lokale lister) | 11 |
| Total number of members: | 20 |

Rauland heradsstyre 1945–1947
| Party name (in Nynorsk) | Number of representatives |
|---|---|
| Labour Party (Arbeidarpartiet) | 9 |
| Joint list of the Liberal Party (Venstre) and the Radical People's Party (Radikale Folkepartiet) | 1 |
| Local List(s) (Lokale lister) | 10 |
| Total number of members: | 20 |

Rauland heradsstyre 1937–1941*
| Party name (in Nynorsk) | Number of representatives |
|---|---|
| Local List(s) (Lokale lister) | 20 |
| Total number of members: | 20 |
Note: Due to the German occupation of Norway during World War II, no elections were held for new municipal councils until after the war ended in 1945.

=== Mayors ===
The mayor (Norwegian: ordførar) of Rauland Municipality was the political leader of the municipality and the chairperson of the municipal council. The following people have held this position:

- 1860–1861: Aanund O. Gjore
- 1862–1863: Rikard A. Berge
- 1864–1867: Johannes Brekka
- 1868–1871: Bjørn A. Gaardsgjore
- 1872–1875: Rikard A. Berge
- 1876–1881: Knut A. Svalastoga
- 1882–1883: Rikard A. Berge
- 1884–1885: Aslak A. Lid
- 1886–1890: Knut B. Svalastoga
- 1891–1893: Tor Vaa
- 1894–1895: Olav R. Berge
- 1896–1900: Aslak J. Groven
- 1901–1901: Sivert Vaagen
- 1902–1904: Olav R. Berge
- 1905–1913: Sivert Vaagen
- 1914–1919: Bjørn Lofthus
- 1920–1928: Aslak K. Øygarden
- 1929–1931: Rasmus Graasvoll
- 1932–1934: Aslak K. Svalastoga (Ap)
- 1935–1940: Knut Kramviken
- 1941–1942: Aslak K. Øygarden (NS)
- 1942–1945: Einar Vaagen (NS)
- 1945–1945: O.N. Longvik (Ap)
- 1946–1959: Aslak K. Svalastoga (Ap)
- 1959–1963: Tarjei Kramviken (Ap)

== Notable people ==
- Sveinung Svalastoga (1772–1809), a rose-painter, poet and woodcarver
- Rikard Berge (1881–1969), a folklorist, museologist, and magazine editor
- Aslaug Vaa (1889–1965), a poet and playwright
- Olav Aslakson Versto (1892–1977), a Norwegian politician for the Norwegian Labour Party
- Dyre Vaa (1903–1980), a sculptor and painter

== See also ==
- List of former municipalities of Norway
