= Sveinung Svalastoga =

Norwegian rose painter, poet and woodcarver

Sveinung Bjørnson Svalastoga (1772–1809) was a Norwegian rose painter, poet, and woodcarver.

== Biography ==
Sveinung Bjørnson Svalastoga was born in Rauland prestegjeld (now part of Vinje Municipality) in Telemark County. He was the son of Bjørn Bjørnson Gardsjord (1731-1782) and Ingebjørg Rikardsdotter Svalastoga (1730-1776). He was born at Svalastoga, one of the area's oldest farms.

Sveinung Svalastoga painted living room interiors, cupboards, chests, and bowls with powerful and colorful designs, often randomly placed. Many of his works have been retained, both room decorations as well as smaller objects like chests and cupboards. He was also known for the mystical figures he cut and carved from twisted mountain pines, such as a mystical woman and her man, and a fairy tale princess set up at the corner of the storehouse. In addition, he often painted figures, especially biblical and mythological, with a naive touch.

Svalastoga probably had two working winters in Numedal, first 1801-1802 and then 1806–07. A major work is the living room interior at Nordigard Berdal in Vinje from 1802. In 1803, he also painted the altarpiece of the new Rauland Church (Rauland kyrkje).
