= Rikard Berge =

Norwegian folklorist, museologist biographer, and editor

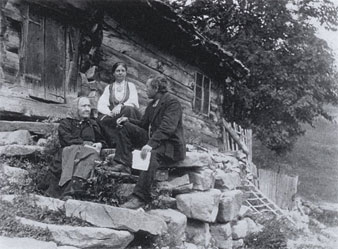
- Margit Tveiten, Johanna Bugge Berge and Rikard Berge (ca. 1899)
- Born: 7 November 1881; Rauland Municipality, Telemark, Norway
- Died: 26 September 1969 (aged 87); Skien, Telemark, Norway
- Occupations: folklorist, museologist biographer and magazine editor
- Spouse: Johanna Bugge Berge

Rikard Berge (7 November 1881 – 26 September 1969) was a Norwegian folklorist, museologist biographer and magazine editor.

== Biography ==
Rikard Gjermundsen Berge was born in Rauland Municipality (now in Vinje Municipality) in Telemark county, Norway. He was the son of Geirmund Hallvordsson (1857–1926) and Sigrid Rikardsdotter Berge (1854–1943).

Berge started writing down traditional folklore from the rural districts of Telemark from he was twelve years old. From 1908 he was married to the painter Johanna Bugge (1874–1961), daughter of Sophus Bugge (1833–1907) and Karen Sophie Schreiner (1835–1897). Her father was professor of philology, Indo-European linguistics and Old Norse at Christiania University (now University of Oslo). Berge inherited the collections of folk songs from his father-in-law.

In 1907 Berge helped establish the Kviteseid District Museum and in 1909 the Fyresdal Local History Museum. He was curator of the Telemark Museum from 1916 to 1951.

Berge wrote mostly about of folk culture and music. He published two journals: Norsk bondesylv from 1925 and the series Bygdedikting fraa Telemarki (23 volumes, from 1907 to 1933). Among his works are biographies of the fiddlers Myllarguten (1908) and Håvard Gibøen (1932). He also edited the magazine Norsk folkekultur from 1915 to 1935.
