= Knut Luraas =

Norwegian fiddler

- Born: 1782; Tinn, Norway
- Died: 1843 (aged 60–61); Kongsberg
- Occupation: Hardingfele fiddler
- Relatives: Thomas Luraas (brother)

Knut Luraas (1782–1843) was a Norwegian Hardingfele fiddler and artist. He was born in Tinn; the son of farmer Øystein Gunnulfson Ingulvsland and Birgit Knutsdotter Mellomgarden Luraas, and was the brother of clarinetist and rose painter Thomas Luraas. He was among the most prominent hardingfele fiddlers in the early 1800s, and folklorist Rikard Berge named the period after Luraas. He is known for his influence on later generation of folk musicians, including fiddlers Håvard Gibøen and Myllarguten. He died in Kongsberg in 1843.
