= Myllarguten =

Norwegian musician

Torgeir Augundsson
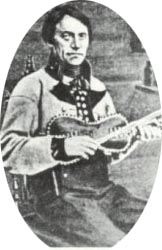

Background information
- Also known as: Myllarguten
- Origin: Sauherad Municipality, Norway
- Died: 21 November 1872
- Genre: Folk
- Occupation: Musician
- Instrument: Hardingfele

Torgeir Augundsson (1801 – 21 November 1872), better known as Myllarguten (meaning the Millerboy), is arguably the most acknowledged Norwegian folk musician to this day, and by far the most legendary. In his own local dialect, his given name is pronounced Targjei.

== Childhood ==
Torgeir was born in Sauherad Municipality in Telemark. The date of his birth is disputed (the years range from 1799 to 1801), and some say his father Augund was only registered as the father of the boy (in the local church documentation). He married Gunhild, the mother, in October 1801. Torgeir was already born at the time. Usually, farmers of the Norwegian serfdom stock is not very well documented, often moving from homestead to homestead.

Myllarguten's father was a country fiddler, one of many at the time, and Torgeir was going for the fiddle from early age, but it is told he feared his father would beat him if he tried the instrument. So he sneaked himself to playing while his father was outside and at work at the local mill. His father's profession gave Torgeir his name, the Millerboy. One day the father returned early from work and heard someone inside playing, and asked astonished who the player was. His wife, Gunhild, had to admit it was his son Torgeir. From then on, Augund his father trained him, but the boy was so eager his father had to give him away to other fiddlers in the area.

== Education ==
Amongst his teachers were the fiddlers Knut Lurås from Tinn Municipality, Jon Kjos from Åmotsdal, Mattis Flathus from Sauherad Municipality and Øystein Langedrag from Bø Municipality. The latter had been a soldier in the Napoleonic Wars and had some experience with military music, which influenced his style, and to a degree the style of Myllarguten. The fiddler he regarded the best of his teachers, was Knut Lurås, one of two colleague fiddlers he really appreciated. As his reputation grew, Torgeir was known as a hard critic and a merciless competitor. He did not like to be bested at playing. The other he held in esteem, was Håvard Gibøen, regarded as his traditional counterpart in folk music from Telemark. Håvard was the only fiddler of whom Torgeir would say: "He is the master of us all".

== Life as a fiddler ==
Life as a fiddler was a life on the road. He soon got reputation, and played from early on at weddings and county feasts all over Telemark. He soon made longer journeys, and spanned the country as far as Bergen and Gudbrandsdalen. He eventually got married, with Ingebjørg Eddandshaugen from Vinje Municipality, and had ten children by her, of whom at least four sons became fiddlers themselves, and through them, the music from Torgeir has been passed on down to this day in Telemark.

=== Living conditions ===
Most of his life, Tarjei lived as a serf, moving with his family from homestead to homestead, not resting more than a few years at each place. The success of 1849 made enough income to raise a proper farm in Rauland Municipality. But mostly he lived as a pauper, often lacking proper clothing when traveling on tours. People in the county who knew him, often tried to help him with food and clothes as well as money. It is reported that Myllarguten, in spite of his talent, seldom earned enough to feed and clothe his wife and children. When he was away for months, Ingebjørg and the children was in danger of starving, but they were often helped out. It is said that Ingebjørg held it "beneath her" to go out begging, even when food was scarce.

Torgeir and Ingebjørg had ten children, of which seven survived childhood.

== Meeting Ole Bull ==
In 1831 he met Ole Bull in Bergen and became his friend for life. Bull was on a short visit between tours, and was at the time looking for a personal and national expression. He had not yet opened his mind for the rural music, but when hearing Myllarguten, he got exactly what he had looked for. Later, he said: "There has not been a one fiddler that has made me content in such a way". The two understood each other, and soon became friends. Bull wrote down some of the tunes he heard, and borrowed Myllarguten's fiddle, and in turn played classical music for the fiddler. They both came enriched from the meeting, and Bull always played some Norwegian folk music on his concerts after this. Thus, he made the rural tunes known to a larger public for the first time. The meeting had lasting impact in the evolving romantic nationalism in Norway.

After this meeting, they did not meet again for 17 years, until Bull endeavored to make a concert with Myllarguten in Christiania February 1849, when romantic nationalism was at its very peak in Norway. The concert became a commercial success, and the hall was packed with 1500 excited listeners, among them some from Telemark, who had got free tickets. The known author Aasmund Olavsson Vinje decided not to go, afraid that the concert might go awry for the sensible fiddler, and would not be held responsible as a man from the same district, which he was.

When going on stage, Myllarguten had to break his crate open with a knife, and was delayed several minutes. This made him nervous, and he started playing other tunes than the appointed. But he soon played himself into ecstasy as was his wont, and the audience cheered. Newspapers called him a "true child of nature", and praised him with eulogies and poems. On the other hand, the urban audience was more excited by the event than the music, as the traditional music was and is a music for trained ears. When the romantic wave died down, Myllarguten became a has-been, and was regarded as nothing more than a "drunken Telemark farmer".

The concerts gave him money to raise a farm in Rauland Municipality, and the more experienced farmer Rikard Aslaksson Berge helped him in this. Myllarguten had played at his wedding, and was a regular guest at the farm. Thus, his music was passed on to Rikard's sons, and from them to his grandson Eivind Groven.

== Later years ==
In spite of his successes abroad, Torgeir was not able to keep his money, and had to leave his farm in the end. The last years of his life, he was tired of playing, and became gradually harder to ask. Sometimes, he became depressed and cursed both his fiddle and Ole Bull and all the rest. He felt alone, frustrated and lost, but was still appreciated by his own community.

Myllarguten died a pauper in 1872. The cause of death is said to have been tuberculosis, which he had suffered from some years. His funeral was timid, consisting of one single boat and no flowers (it was custom to travel to the church by water, crossing the lake Totak. That was easier than taking the road). He is buried at the cemetery at Rauland Church in Telemark. It was reckoned a pity that this should befall the greatest fiddler in Norway. But he is well remembered, and through his descendants passed on a vivid musical tradition that lives on in Telemark to this very day. All the county honors his memory. A memorial stone was later set up at his grave.

== Musical style ==
Myllarguten was from the beginning a traditional folk musician, schooled and educated in local tradition. The meeting with Ole Bull had a lasting impact on his style, and he began to explore the limits of his instrument in new and more advanced ways. He also turned his tonality more towards the classical ideals, rather than the more rural blue note. In 1853, Carl Schart, an organist in Bergen, transcribed five of Myllarguten's tunes, and those came later into print. This example shows a vivid musical mind, and a great performer.

== Sources ==
Most of the sources for Myllarguten's life were written down from living memory, accounted by people who had met the fiddler, and his close relatives. Other sources exist as articles by romantic nationalists in Norway, who met the fiddler and described him. All the material was collected and edited by the folklorist Rikard Berge, himself from Telemark, and grandson of Rikard Aslaksson as mentioned above. He had first-hand information, and collected material for twelve years, from 1896 to 1908, meeting many older people who remembered Myllarguten. Thus, he put together a thorough and useful biography and a valuable source.

Concerning the meeting of Ole Bull and Myllarguten: Told by the farmer Rikard Aslaksson Berge, as rendered by Myllarguten himself, Tor Vaa from Rauland Municipality, and Gregar Torgeirsson, Myllarguten's son. The latter also told of the concert in Christiania, which is also well documented from contemporary written material.

Concerning the fiddler's childhood: Told by Gunnhild Flatastøyl, daughter-in-law, Ingebjørg Pilodden from Sauherad Municipality, and Gregar Torgeirsson.

Myllarguten's technical abilities and musical style: Øystein Hovdestad, Vinje Municipality, among others.

His funeral: Signe Øydgarden, Rauland Municipality. She was an eye-witness to the event.

All the material is edited and published in Rikard Berge Myllarguten-Gibøen, Noregs Boklag 1972 (second edition). The original biography was published in 1911.
