= Thomas Luraas =

Norwegian rose painter

- Born: 1799; Tinn, Norway
- Died: 6 June 1886 (aged 86–87)
- Occupation: rose painter
- Relatives: Knut Luraas (brother)

Thomas Luraas (1799–6 June 1886) was a Norwegian rose painter and clarinetist.

He was born in the Tinn prestegjeld in Telemark, Norway. He was the son of farmer Øystein Gunnulfson Ingulvsland and Birgit Knutsdotter Mellomgarden Luraas, and was the brother of Hardanger fiddler Knut Luraas. He was regarded among the most prominent painters of his time in the Rosemaling tradition of Telemark. Among his most important decorative works are paintings of the interior at Suigard Juvland in Rauland from 1832, at Gunvaldjord in Haukeli from 1840, and at Lønndalen in Tuddal from 1849.

== Related reading ==
- Ellingsgard, Nils (1999) Norsk rosemåling – Dekorativ måling i folkekunsten (Oslo, Det norske samlaget) ISBN 82-521-5522-7
