= Øyfjell Church =

Church in Telemark, Norway

- Øyfjell kyrkje
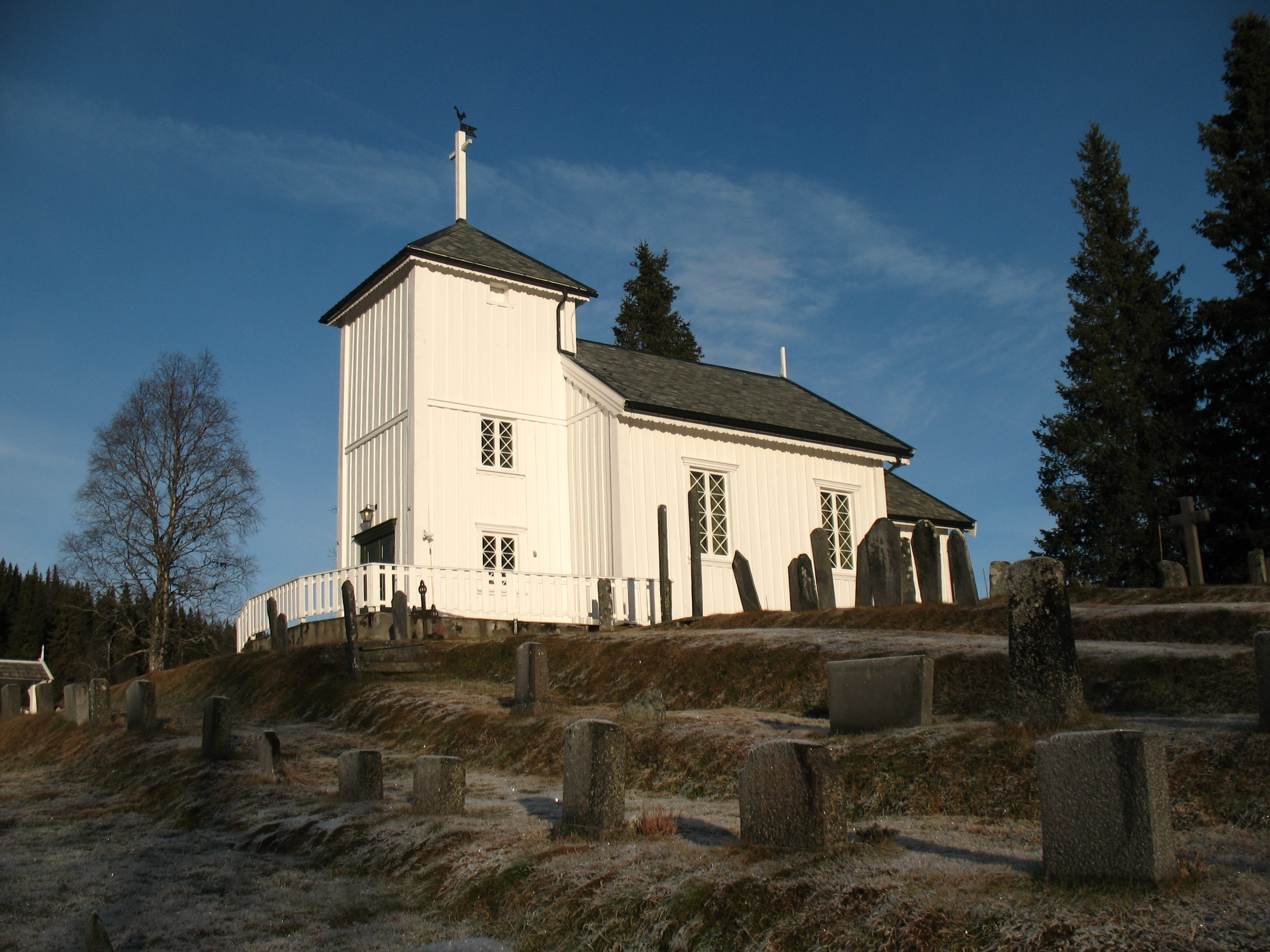
- View of the church
- Øyfjell Church
- 59°34′29″N 8°10′27″E
- Location: Vinje Municipality, Telemark
- Country: Norway
- Denomination: Church of Norway
- Previous denomination: Catholic Church
- Churchmanship: Evangelical Lutheran

History
- Status: Parish church
- Founded: 13th century
- Consecrated: 1833

Architecture
- Functional status: Active
- Architect: Hans Linstow
- Architectural type: Long church
- Completed: 1833 (193 years ago)

Specifications
- Capacity: 72
- Materials: Wood

Administration
- Diocese: Agder og Telemark
- Deanery: Øvre Telemark prosti
- Parish: Øyfjell
- Norwegian Cultural Heritage Site
- Type: Church
- Status: Automatically protected
- ID: 85940

Øyfjell Church (Norwegian: Øyfjell kyrkje) is a parish church of the Church of Norway in Vinje Municipality in Telemark county, Norway. It is located in the village of Øyfjell. It is the church for the Øyfjell parish which is part of the Øvre Telemark prosti (deanery) in the Diocese of Agder og Telemark. The white, wooden church was built in a long church design in 1833 using plans drawn up by the architect Hans Linstow. The church seats about 72 people.

== History ==
The earliest existing historical records of the church date back to the year 1401, but the church was not new that year. The first church in Øyfjell was a wooden stave church that was built during the first half of the 13th century. Not much is known about the old church, but it is said that the church was similar in design to the Eidsborg Stave Church. It is said that the entire population of the whole parish except one single woman died during the Black Death. Records show that services were held in the church about eight times per year during the late 1500s. In 1668, the church was still standing and it was described as a stave church surrounded by open-air covered corridors. After several centuries, the church had fallen in to disrepair by the early 1800s. In 1826, the church was torn down and a new church built on the same foundations. The new long church was built in log construction using designs by Hans Linstow. The new church was consecrated in the fall of 1833. The new church has a square nave with a tower on the west. In 1963, a sacristy was built on the east end.

== Media gallery ==
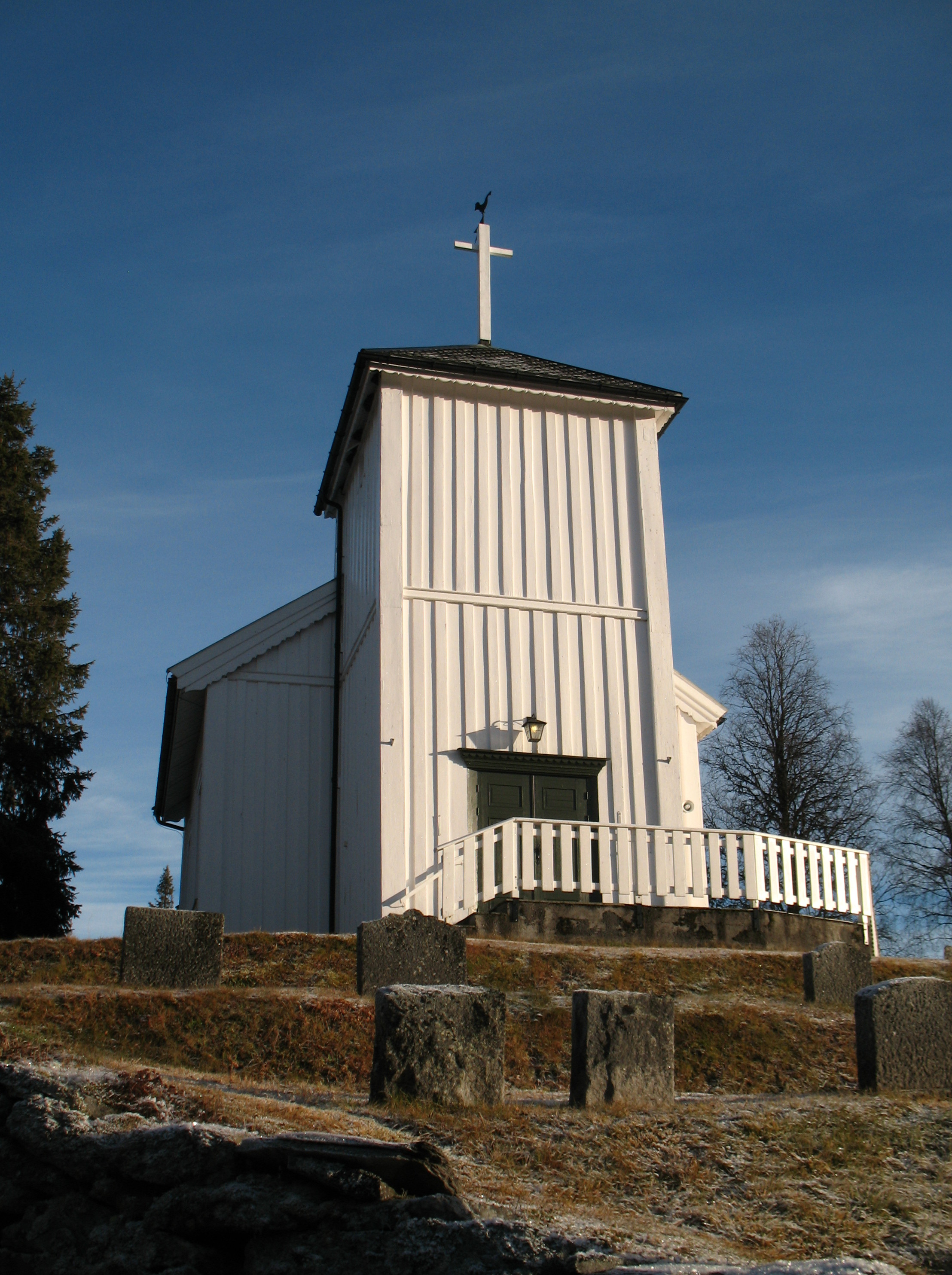

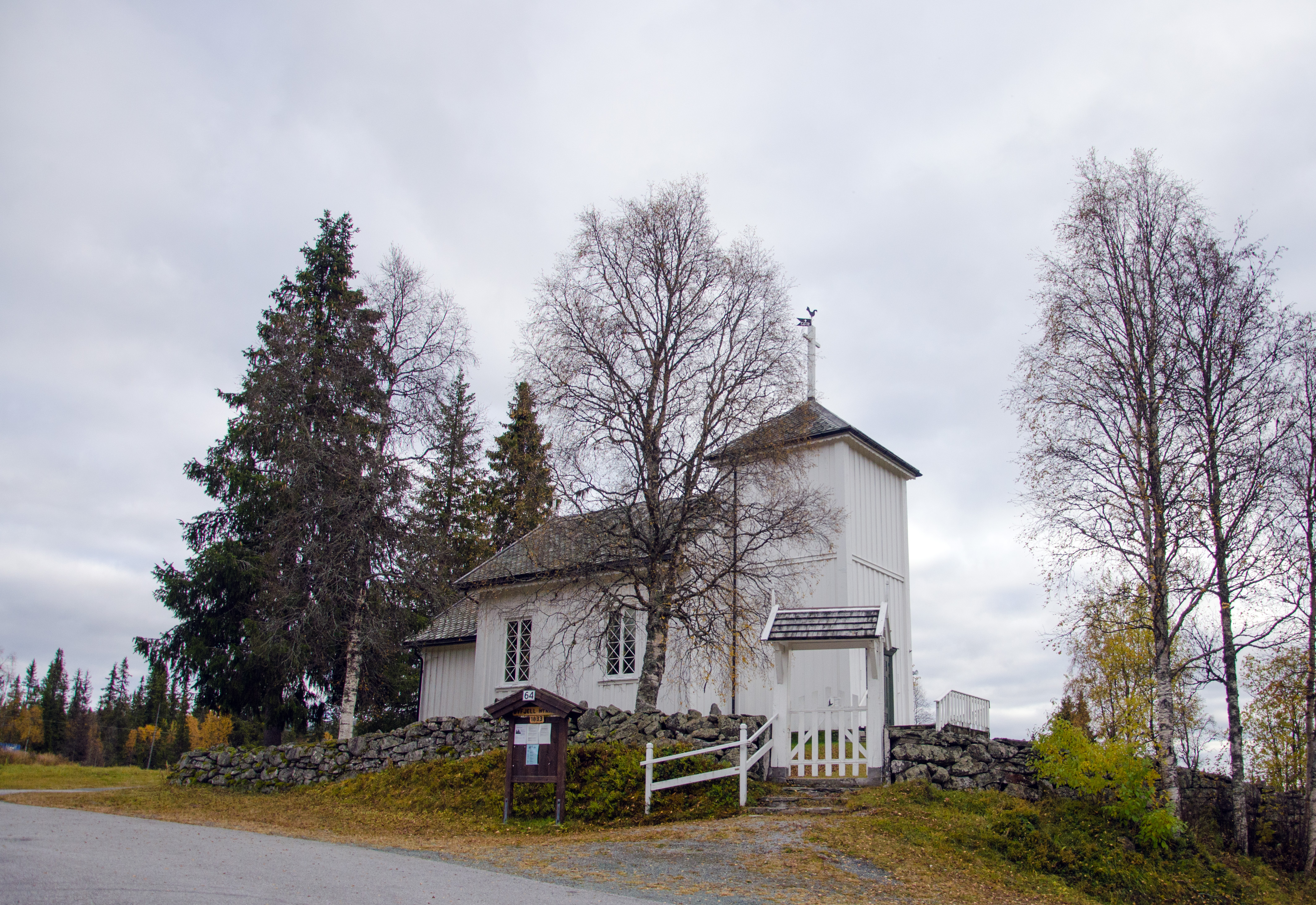

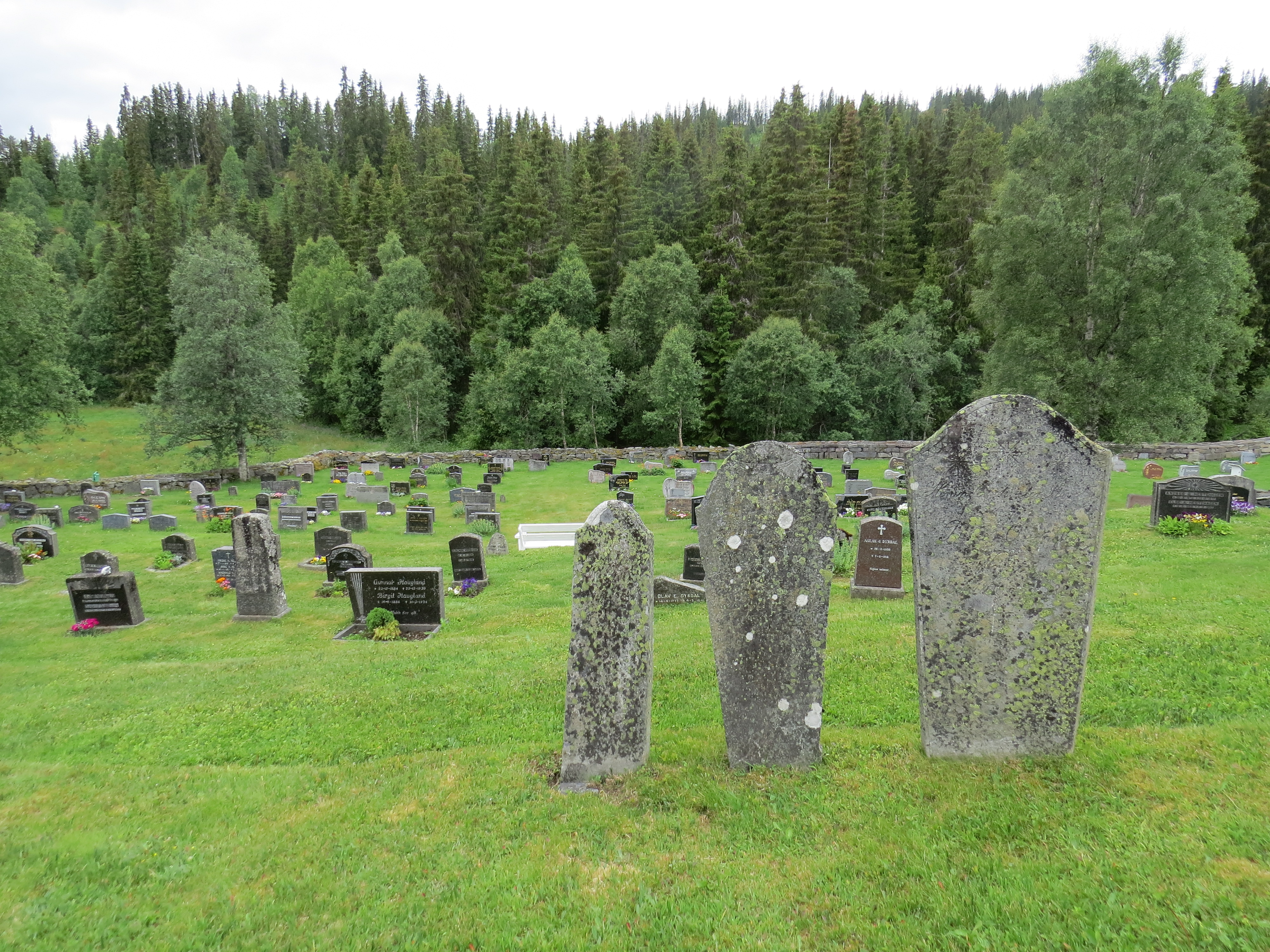

== See also ==
- List of churches in Agder og Telemark
