= Møsstrond Church =

Church in Telemark, Norway

- Møsstrond kyrkje
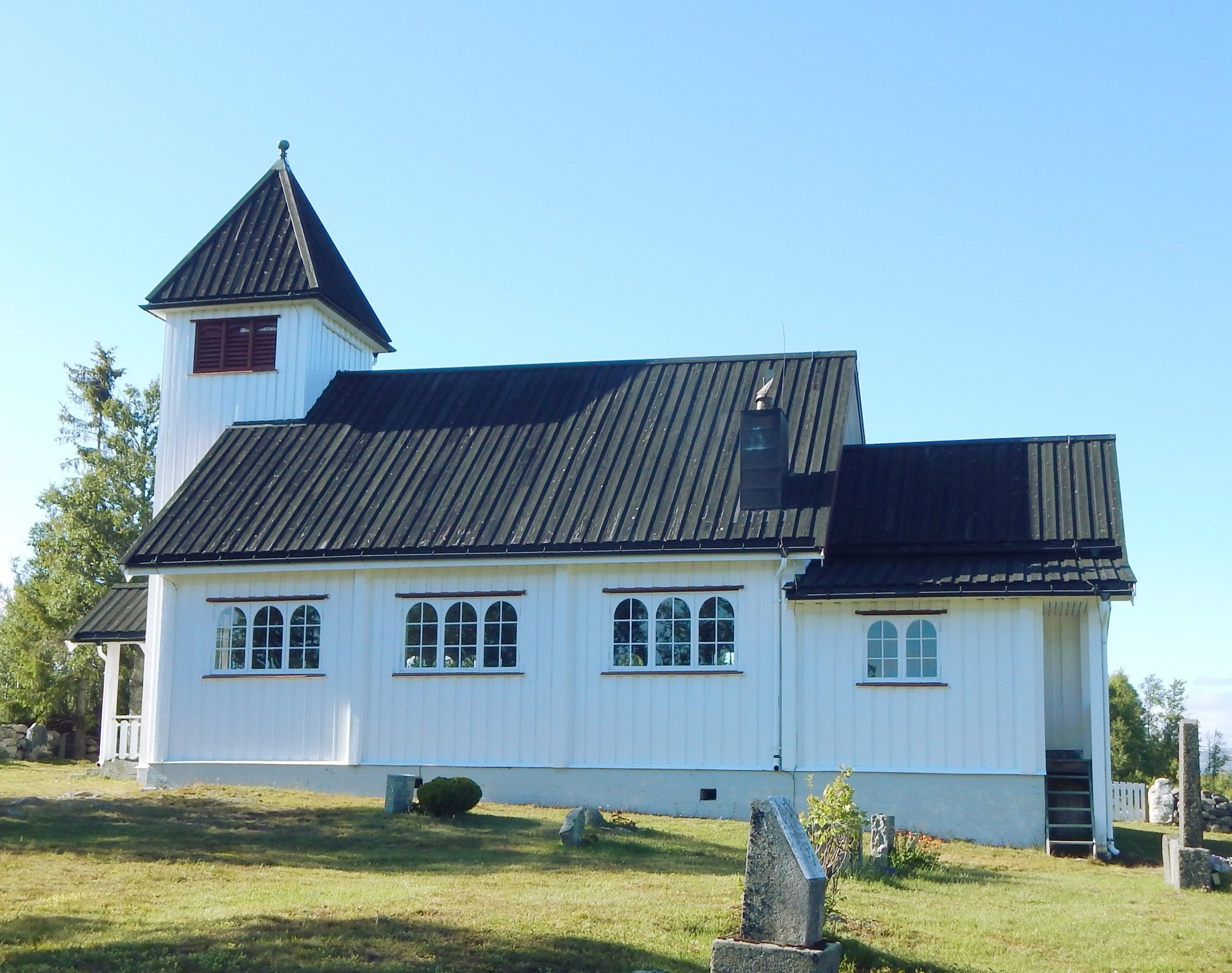
- View of the church
- Møsstrond Church
- 59°51′08″N 8°03′56″E
- Location: Vinje Municipality, Telemark
- Country: Norway
- Denomination: Church of Norway
- Churchmanship: Evangelical Lutheran

History
- Status: Parish church
- Founded: 1849
- Consecrated: 1923

Architecture
- Functional status: Active
- Architect: Olav O. Bitustøyl
- Architectural type: Long church
- Completed: 1923 (103 years ago)

Specifications
- Capacity: 100
- Materials: Wood

Administration
- Diocese: Agder og Telemark
- Deanery: Øvre Telemark prosti
- Parish: Rauland
- Norwegian Cultural Heritage Site
- Type: Church
- Status: Not protected
- ID: 85086

Møsstrond Church (Norwegian: Møsstrond kyrkje) is a parish church of the Church of Norway in Vinje Municipality in Telemark county, Norway. It is located in the village of Møsstrond. It is one of the churches for the Rauland parish which is part of the Øvre Telemark prosti (deanery) in the Diocese of Agder og Telemark. The white, wooden church was built in a long church design in 1923 using plans drawn up by the architect Olav O. Bitustøyl. The church seats about 100 people.

== History ==
The earliest existing historical records of the church date back to the year 1598, but that was not the year the church was built. There is historical evidence of a medieval church at Hovden (now referred to as Møsstrond), but very little is known about the old church. At some point, however, the church was closed and there are no traces of the old building, nor is the exact site of the old church known. In 1849, a new church was built at Hovden, possibly on the same site as the medieval building. Not much is recorded about that building. In 1903, the nearby lake Møsvatn was dammed and this led to the rising of the water levels on the lake. The church had originally been built on a peninsula, but after the rising of the water, now it is located on a small island. The church serves the people in the village of Møsstrond on the island as well as the rural areas surrounding the lake (many of those areas are not connected to the national road network and are only accessible by boat). The church was struck by lightning in the summer of 1919 and burned to the ground. Olav O. Bitustøyl was hired to design the new church. The new church was completed and consecrated in 1923. It is a wooden long church with a west tower that is drawn slightly into the nave. The choir is on the east side of the nave and it is flanked by two small sacristies.

== See also ==
- List of churches in Agder og Telemark
