= Øyfjell =

Village in Vinje Municipality, Norway

- Village
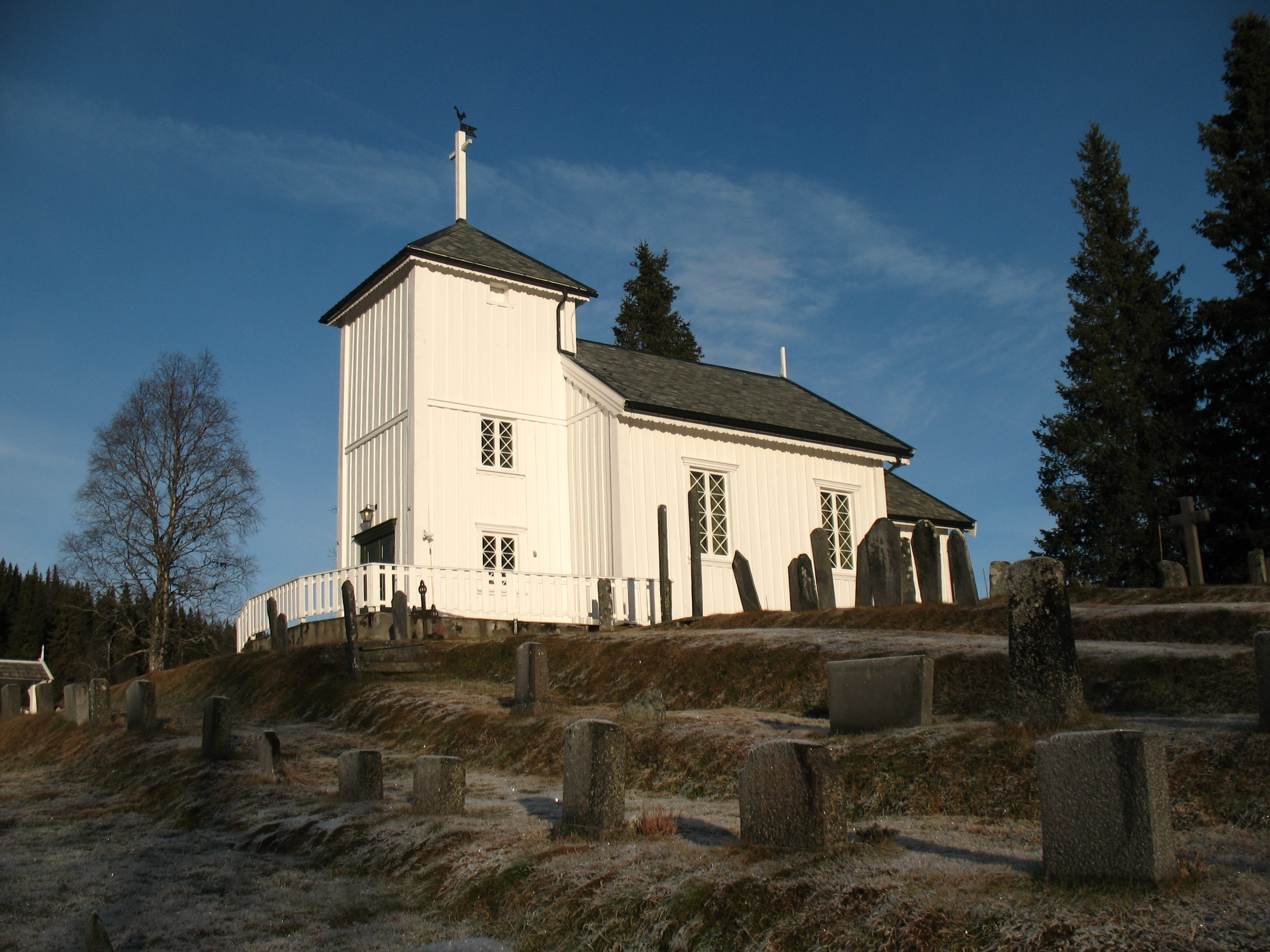
- View of the village church
- Interactive map of Øyfjell
- Coordinates: 59.57349°N 8.18638°E
- Country: Norway
- Region: Eastern Norway
- County: Telemark
- District: Vest-Telemark
- Municipality: Vinje Municipality
- Elevation: 671 m (2,201 ft)
- Time zone: UTC+01:00 (CET)
  - Summer (DST): UTC+02:00 (CEST)
- Post Code: 3890 Vinje

Øyfjell is a village in Vinje Municipality in Telemark county, Norway. The village is located in the southeastern part of the municipality, along the river Vikåi, about 15 kilometres (9.3 mi) to the east of the village of Åmot. Øyfjell Church is located in the village.

As many other rural villages in Norway, Øyfjell has witnessed a decline in population. Currently the village is trying to reverse the development with a project which aims to draw people and businesses to the village.

== Name ==
The name of the village might be derived from Ødefjeld (which translates to "desolate mountain"). The origin of the name is connected to the impact left on the village by the Black Death when the residents of the area all died out, leaving the area desolated for a time.
