= Møsstrond =

Village in Vinje Municipality, Norway

- Village
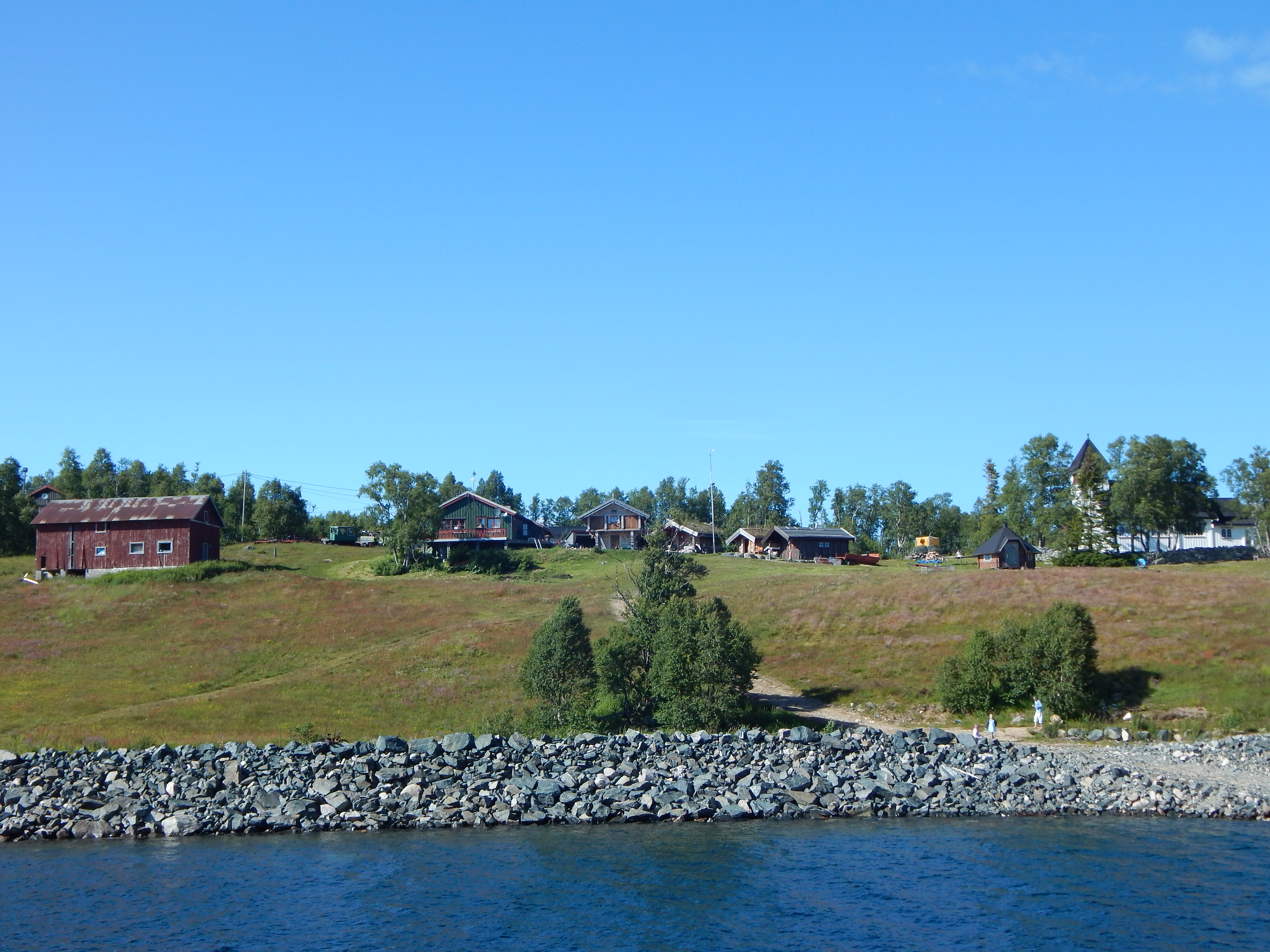
- View of the village
- Interactive map of Møsstrond
- Coordinates: 59.85234°N 8.06536°E
- Country: Norway
- Region: Eastern Norway
- County: Telemark
- District: Vest-Telemark
- Municipality: Vinje Municipality
- Elevation: 932 m (3,058 ft)
- Time zone: UTC+01:00 (CET)
  - Summer (DST): UTC+02:00 (CEST)
- Post Code: 3864 Rauland

Møsstrond is a small island village in Vinje Municipality in Telemark county, Norway. The village is located on the island Hovdeøyi which lies in the lake Møsvatn, high up in the mountains just east of Hardangervidda National Park. The village is located on the southern part of the island and it is very rural and isolated. The village has no road connections and is only accessible by boat. There are some scattered settlements surrounding the lake that don't have road connections either, so boats are frequently used on the lake during the ice-free period, typically from the end of May to the end of November. When ice is thick enough snowmobiles are used.

Ice conditions have become increasingly unstable over time, especially during spring and early winter. This is because of warmer temperatures. At the same time, the water level is lowered throughout the winter for hydropower generation, regularly leading to open ice cracks during late winter and spring, even in sub-zero temperatures. This makes transportation over the lake difficult. Møsstrond Church is located in the village and it serves the village and the vast, sparsely populated region surrounding the lake.

== Climate ==
The climate in Møsstrond is subarctic (Köppen Dfc), bordering on tundra climate (Köppen ET).

Climate data for Møsstrand II 1991-2020 (977 m, extremes 1980-2025)
Month	Jan	Feb	Mar	Apr	May	Jun	Jul	Aug	Sep	Oct	Nov	Dec	Year
Record high °C (°F)	9.3 (48.7)	9.0 (48.2)	13.0 (55.4)	15.6 (60.1)	24.1 (75.4)	27.4 (81.3)	29.0 (84.2)	25.6 (78.1)	21.9 (71.4)	21.0 (69.8)	11.7 (53.1)	7.6 (45.7)	29.0 (84.2)
Mean daily maximum °C (°F)	−3.4 (25.9)	−2.9 (26.8)	−0.1 (31.8)	4.1 (39.4)	9.3 (48.7)	14.3 (57.7)	16.6 (61.9)	15.1 (59.2)	10.6 (51.1)	4.9 (40.8)	0 (32)	−2.7 (27.1)	5.5 (41.9)
Daily mean °C (°F)	−6.4 (20.5)	−6.7 (19.9)	−4.5 (23.9)	−0.4 (31.3)	4.3 (39.7)	8.9 (48.0)	11.2 (52.2)	10.2 (50.4)	6.5 (43.7)	1.7 (35.1)	−2.5 (27.5)	−5.4 (22.3)	1.4 (34.5)
Mean daily minimum °C (°F)	−9.2 (15.4)	−9.7 (14.5)	−7.9 (17.8)	−4 (25)	0.4 (32.7)	4.6 (40.3)	7.4 (45.3)	6.9 (44.4)	3.9 (39.0)	−0.5 (31.1)	−4.8 (23.4)	−8.3 (17.1)	−1.8 (28.8)
Record low °C (°F)	−31.8 (−25.2)	−30.2 (−22.4)	−25.1 (−13.2)	−20.5 (−4.9)	−12.2 (10.0)	−3.3 (26.1)	−1.3 (29.7)	−0.1 (31.8)	−5.6 (21.9)	−14.4 (6.1)	−21.0 (−5.8)	−25.6 (−14.1)	−31.8 (−25.2)
Average precipitation mm (inches)	77.7 (3.06)	56 (2.2)	48.1 (1.89)	40.2 (1.58)	53.1 (2.09)	68.7 (2.70)	90.2 (3.55)	91.1 (3.59)	80.6 (3.17)	82.7 (3.26)	74 (2.9)	65.6 (2.58)	828 (32.57)
Source 1: yr.no/Norwegian Meteorological Institute
Source 2: NOAA
