= Raulandsgrend =

Village in Vinje Municipality, Norway

Raulandsgrend Rauland
- Village
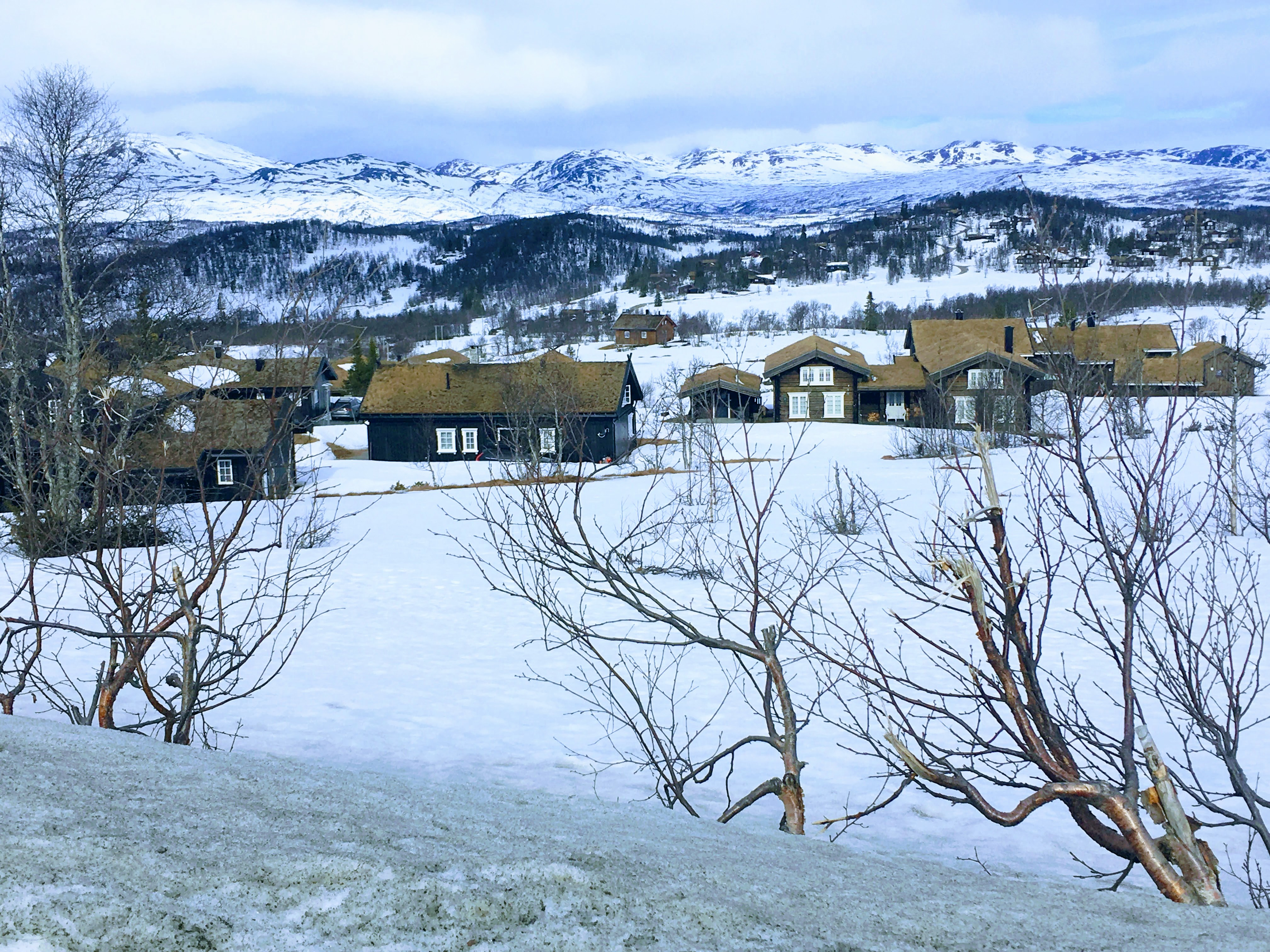
- View of the village
- Interactive map of Raulandsgrend
- Coordinates: 59.72042°N 8.01216°E
- Country: Norway
- Region: Eastern Norway
- County: Telemark
- District: Vest-Telemark
- Municipality: Vinje Municipality
- Elevation: 697 m (2,287 ft)
- Time zone: UTC+01:00 (CET)
  - Summer (DST): UTC+02:00 (CEST)
- Post Code: 3864 Rauland

Raulandsgrend or simply Rauland is a village in Vinje Municipality in Telemark county, Norway. The village is located in a mountainous area along the north shore of the lake Totak, about 4.5 kilometres (2.8 mi) to the northwest of the village of Krysset. The lake Møsvatn lies about 10 kilometres (6.2 mi) to the north and the vast Hardangervidda National Park lies about 20 kilometres (12 mi) to the northwest. The village was once the administrative centre of the old Rauland Municipality which existed from 1860 until 1964.

== History ==
The settlement's origins trace back to the Viking Age, with archaeological evidence indicating early habitation. Notably, the area features rock carvings at Sporaneset, depicting both hunting scenes and agricultural motifs, suggesting a transition from hunter-gatherer societies to settled farming communities.

During the medieval period, Rauland became a significant religious center. The first known church in the area was a stave church constructed in the 13th century. This church was replaced in 1801, and the current Rauland Church, a wooden cruciform structure designed by architect Jarand Rønjom, was consecrated in 1803.

In 1860, Rauland was established as an independent municipality. The municipality encompassed a vast mountainous region, with approximately 90% of its area situated above 900 meters above sea level. Rauland served as the administrative center, housing the municipal government and key institutions. In 1964, Rauland Municipality was merged into the newly formed Vinje Municipality.

The 19th century saw Rauland emerge as a hub for Norwegian folk music, largely due to the influence of Targjei Augundsson, known by his stage name Myllarguten. His home, Myllarheimen, has been preserved as a museum, celebrating his contributions to Norwegian musical heritage.

In recent decades, Raulandsgrend has experienced significant development, particularly in tourism and cabin construction. Since the early 1970s, the area has been among Norway's most popular cabin destinations. This trend accelerated in the early 2000s, driven by deliberate policies aimed at promoting sustainable development and preserving the region's cultural heritage.

== Attractions ==
Raulandsgrend is a village that is its mountainous surroundings where tourists can partake in hiking, recreation, and skiing. It is the largest winter destination in Telemark with three ski resorts, 46 slopes, 16 lifts, and 150 kilometres (93 mi) of cross-country skiing trails. Well-known snowboarding celebrity, Terje Håkonsen, started his career in Rauland. The University of South-Eastern Norway has a campus in Rauland. Rauland Church (built in 1803) is also located in the village. The Rauland Art Museum (Rauland kunstmuseum) includes sculptures, paintings, graphics, and drawings by the sculptor Dyre Vaa.

== Name ==
The village of "Raulandsgrend" (originally the municipality) is named after the old Rauland farm (Old Norse: Rauðaland) since the first Rauland Church was built there. The first element is rauði which means "bog iron". The last element is land which means "land" or "farm". The suffix -grend is a more recent addition, simply meaning "village" or "hamlet", thus it is the village of Rauland. The many marshlands in the area are filled with bog iron and for centuries its production was an important local resource.
