= Rauland Church =

Church in Telemark, Norway

- Rauland kyrkje
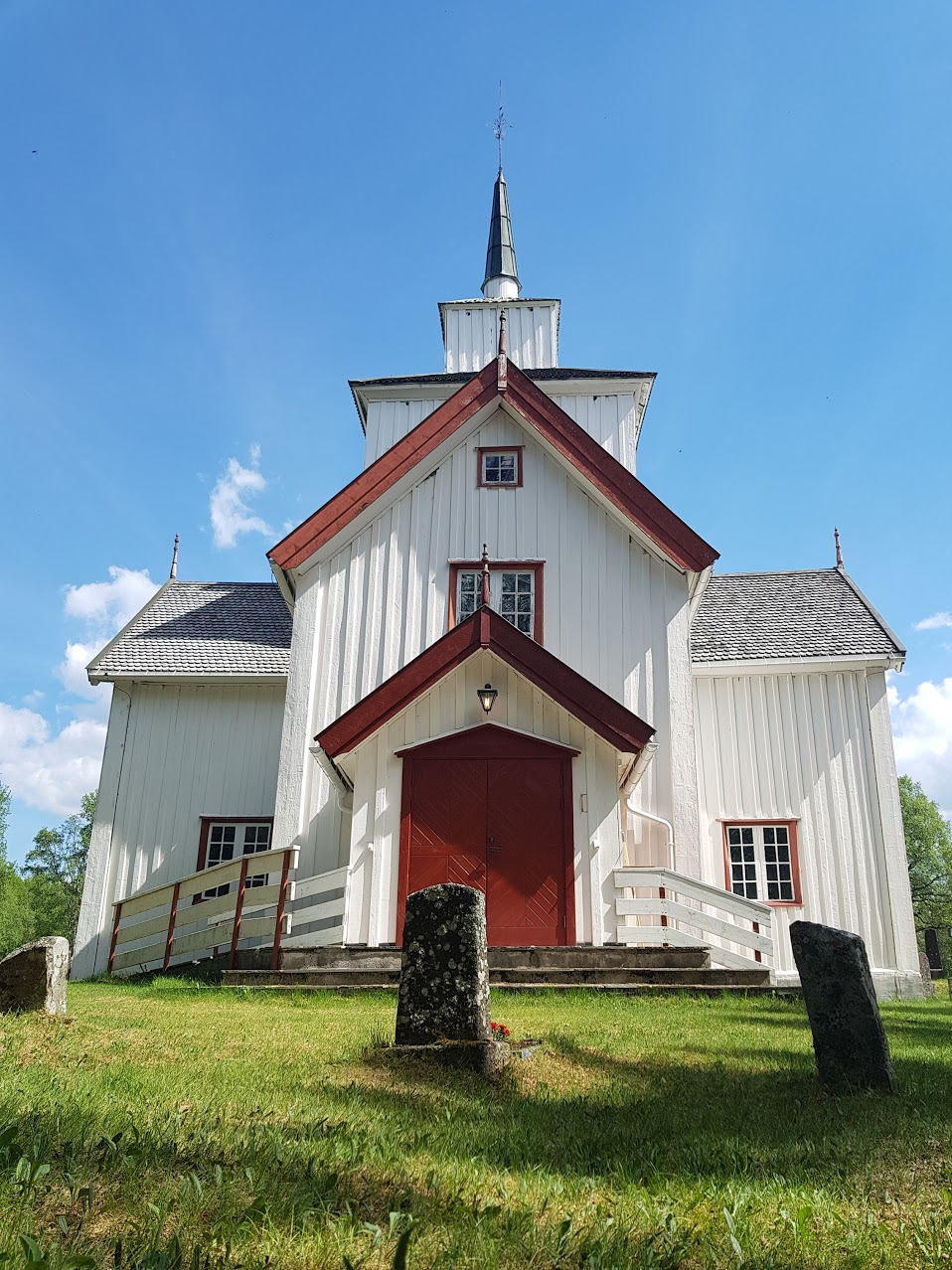
- View of the church
- Rauland Church
- 59°42′59″N 7°59′56″E
- Location: Vinje Municipality, Telemark
- Country: Norway
- Denomination: Church of Norway
- Previous denomination: Catholic Church
- Churchmanship: Evangelical Lutheran

History
- Status: Parish church
- Founded: 13th century
- Consecrated: 1803

Architecture
- Functional status: Active
- Architect: Jarand Rønjom
- Architectural type: Cruciform
- Completed: 1803 (223 years ago)

Specifications
- Capacity: 220
- Materials: Wood

Administration
- Diocese: Agder og Telemark
- Deanery: Øvre Telemark prosti
- Parish: Rauland
- Norwegian Cultural Heritage Site
- Type: Church
- Status: Automatically protected
- ID: 85276

Rauland Church (Norwegian: Rauland kyrkje) is a parish church of the Church of Norway in Vinje Municipality in Telemark county, Norway. It is located in the village of Raulandsgrend on the shore of the lake Totak. It is one of the churches for the Rauland parish which is part of the Øvre Telemark prosti (deanery) in the Diocese of Agder og Telemark. The white, wooden church was built in a cruciform design in 1803 using plans drawn up by the architect Jarand Rønjom. The church seats about people.

== History ==
The earliest existing historical records of the church date back to the year 1491, but the church was not built that year. The first church in Rauland was a wooden stave church that may have been built during the 13th century. By the late 1700s, the old church was in need of replacement. The old church was torn down in 1801 and planning for a new church on the same site began soon after. Jarand Rønjom designed the new church and Halvor Høgkasin was hired as the lead builder. The church has a cruciform design in log construction. It was completed and consecrated in 1803. The church has a tower on the roof above the centre of the nave. The structure inside is much like that of Vinje Church, with a pulpit altar that fills up the eastern transept, and otherwise a T-shaped nave with second floor seating galleries at the end of each wing. It wasn't until the 1990s that electric lighting was installed in the church.

== Media gallery ==
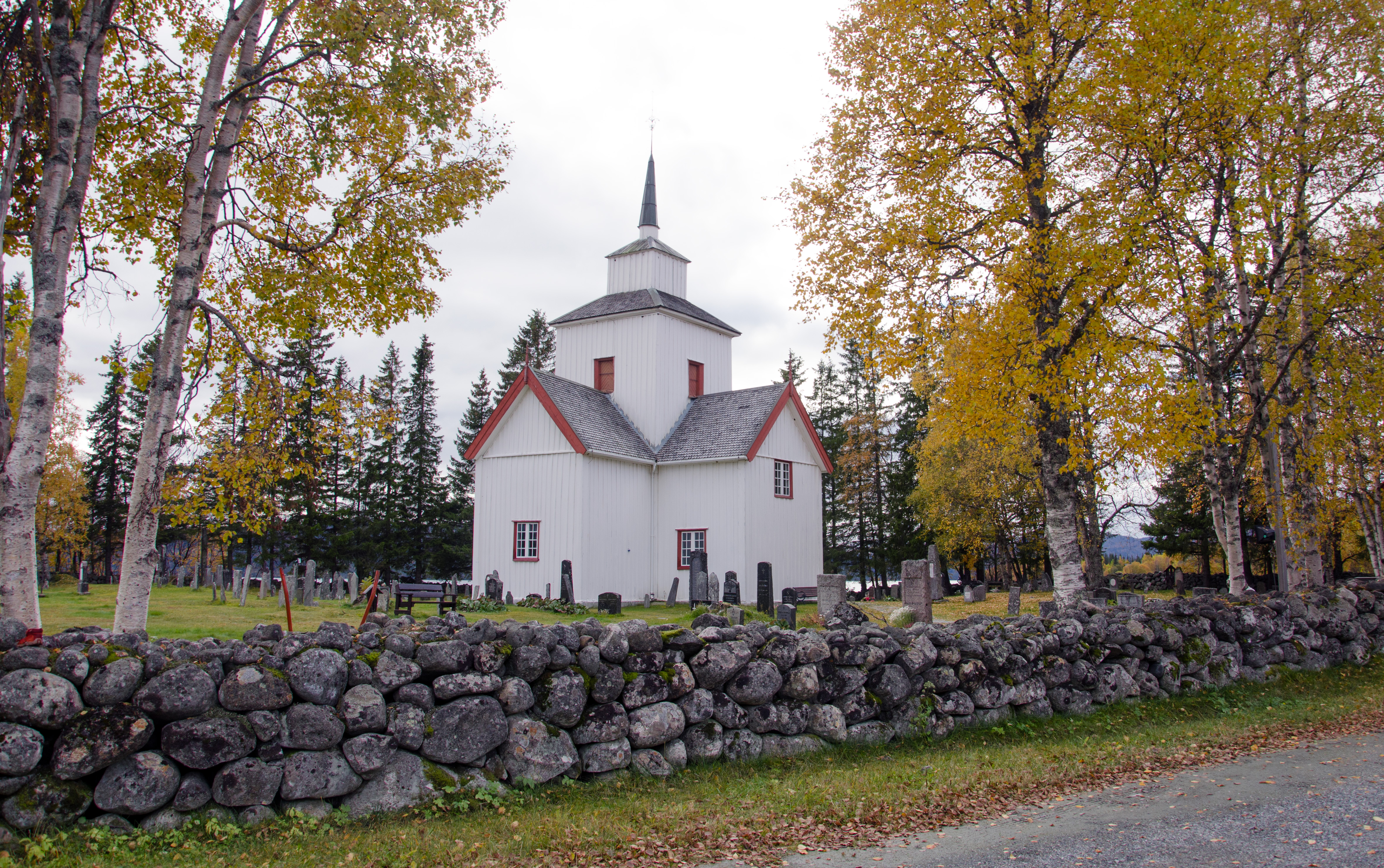

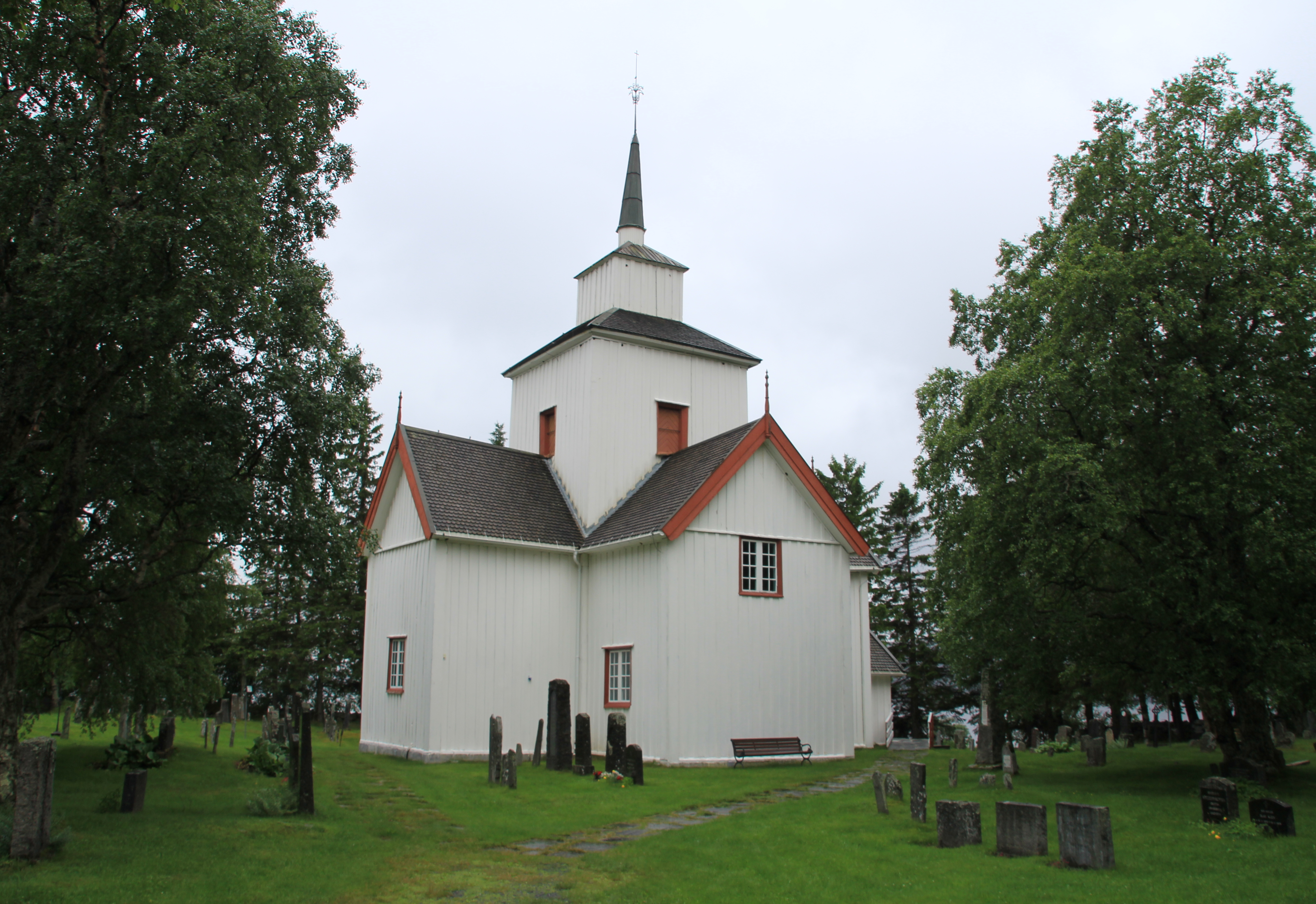

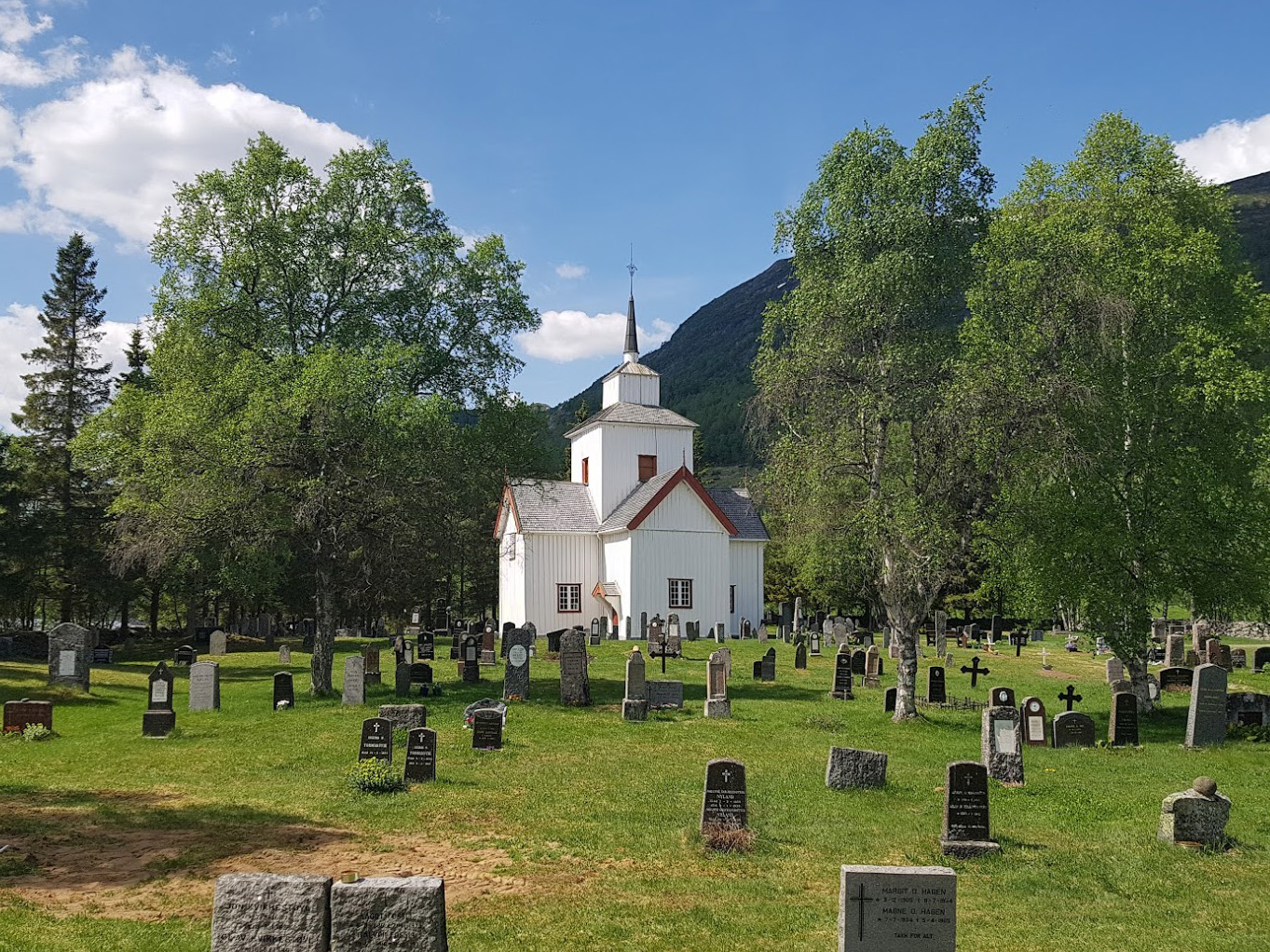

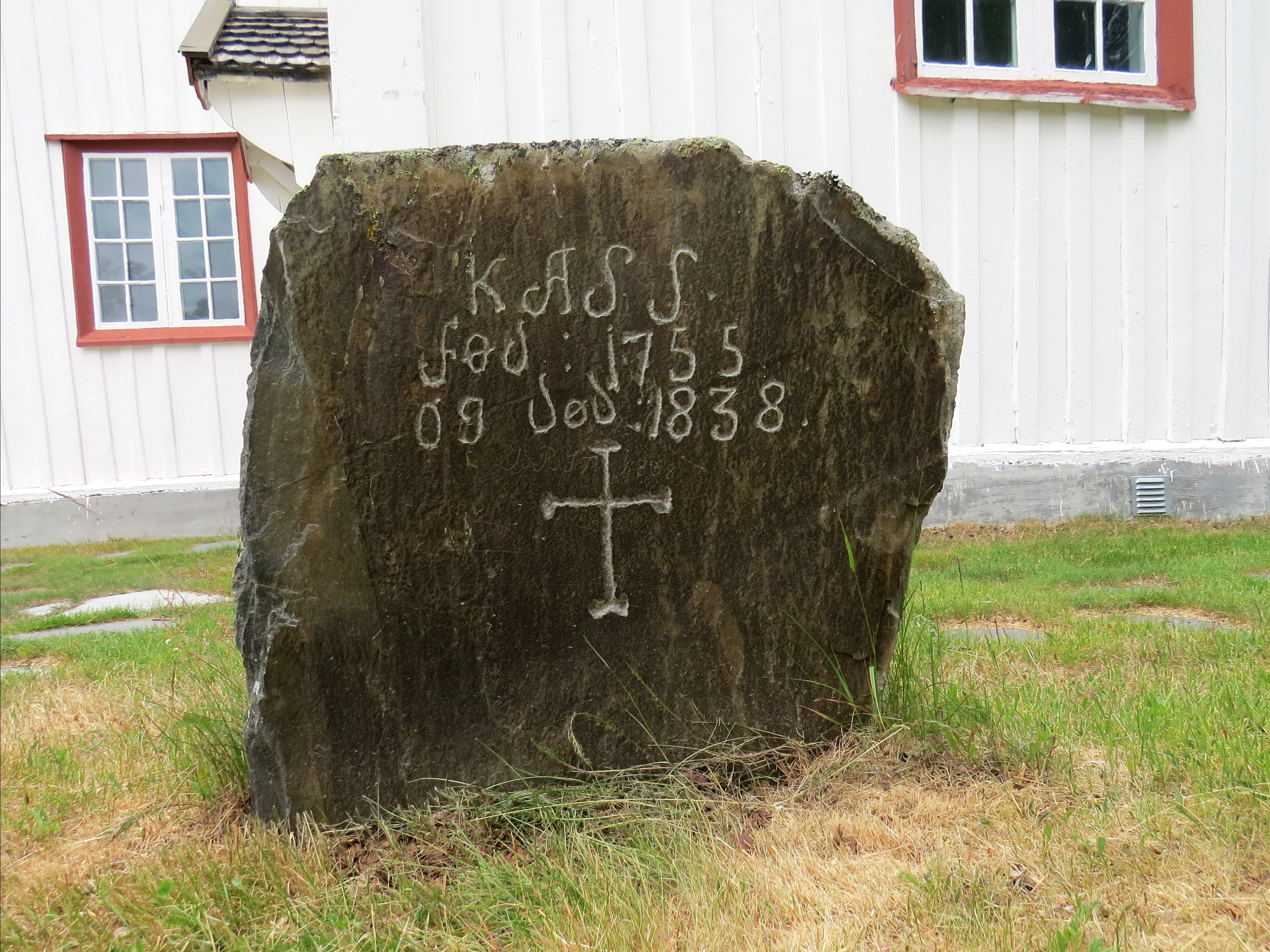

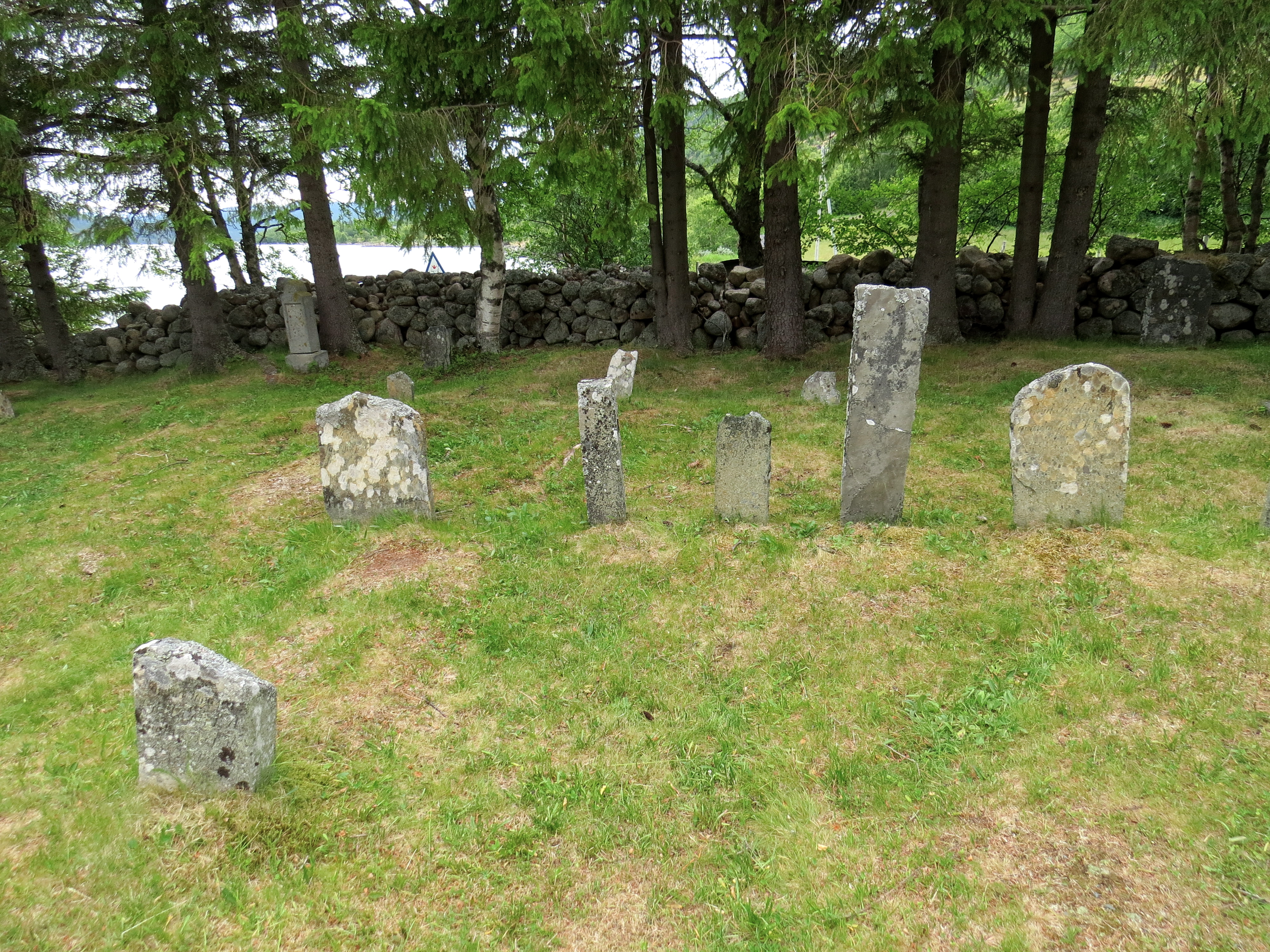

== See also ==
- List of churches in Agder og Telemark
