= Espagnole (disambiguation) =

Espagnole is a sauce in classic French cuisine.

Espagnole (literally "Spanish") may also refer to:

- Espagnole River, river on the Caribbean island of Dominica

== See also ==
- Rhapsodie espagnole (disambiguation), multiple meanings
- Espagnolette
- Español (disambiguation)
- Espanola (disambiguation)
- Hispaniola
