= Amoureux House =

Historic house and museum in Ste. Genevieve, Missouri

Coordinates: 37.9740°N 90.0408°W

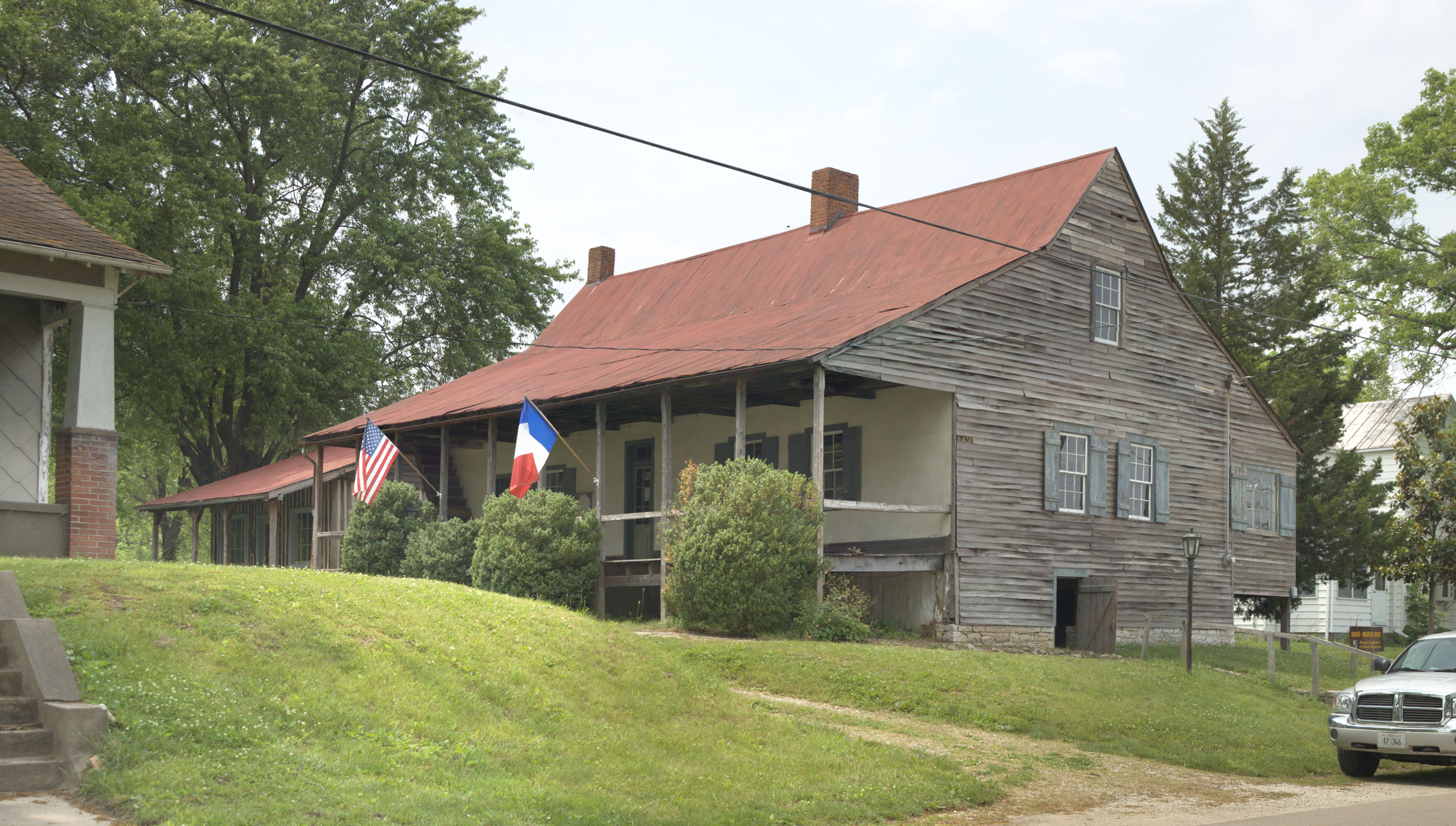
The Amoureux House

The Amoureux House, sometimes called the Beauvais–Amoureux House, is in Ste. Geneviève, Missouri. It was built in 1792 by Jean-Baptiste St. Gemme Beauvais II who moved from Kaskaskia, Illinois. In 1852, it was purchased by Benjamin C. Amoureux, son of a French immigrant.

It is currently operated as a museum by the National Park Service. It is one of three surviving poteaux-en-terre buildings in Ste. Genevieve and one of five surviving in the entire United States. The other Ste. Genevieve poteaux-en-terre buildings are the Bequette-Ribault House and the Vital St. Gemme Beauvais House I (20 S. Main Street). The remaining two are the LaPointe-Krebs House in Pascagoula, Mississippi and the Badin-Roque House near Natchitoches, Louisiana. The Lasource–Durand Cabin is located behind the Amoureux House.

== Galleries ==
=== Amoureux House ===
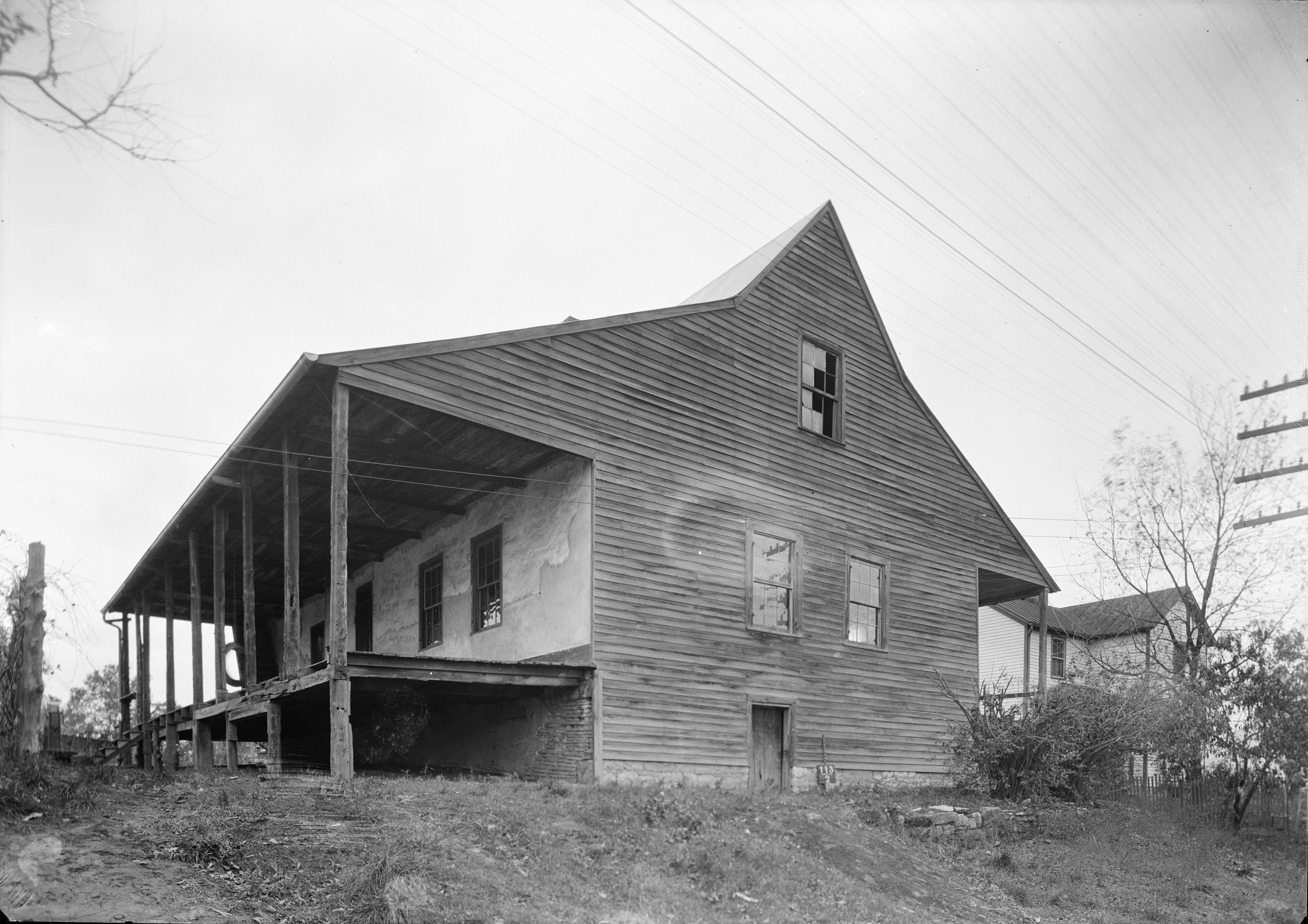
The East Side in 1937

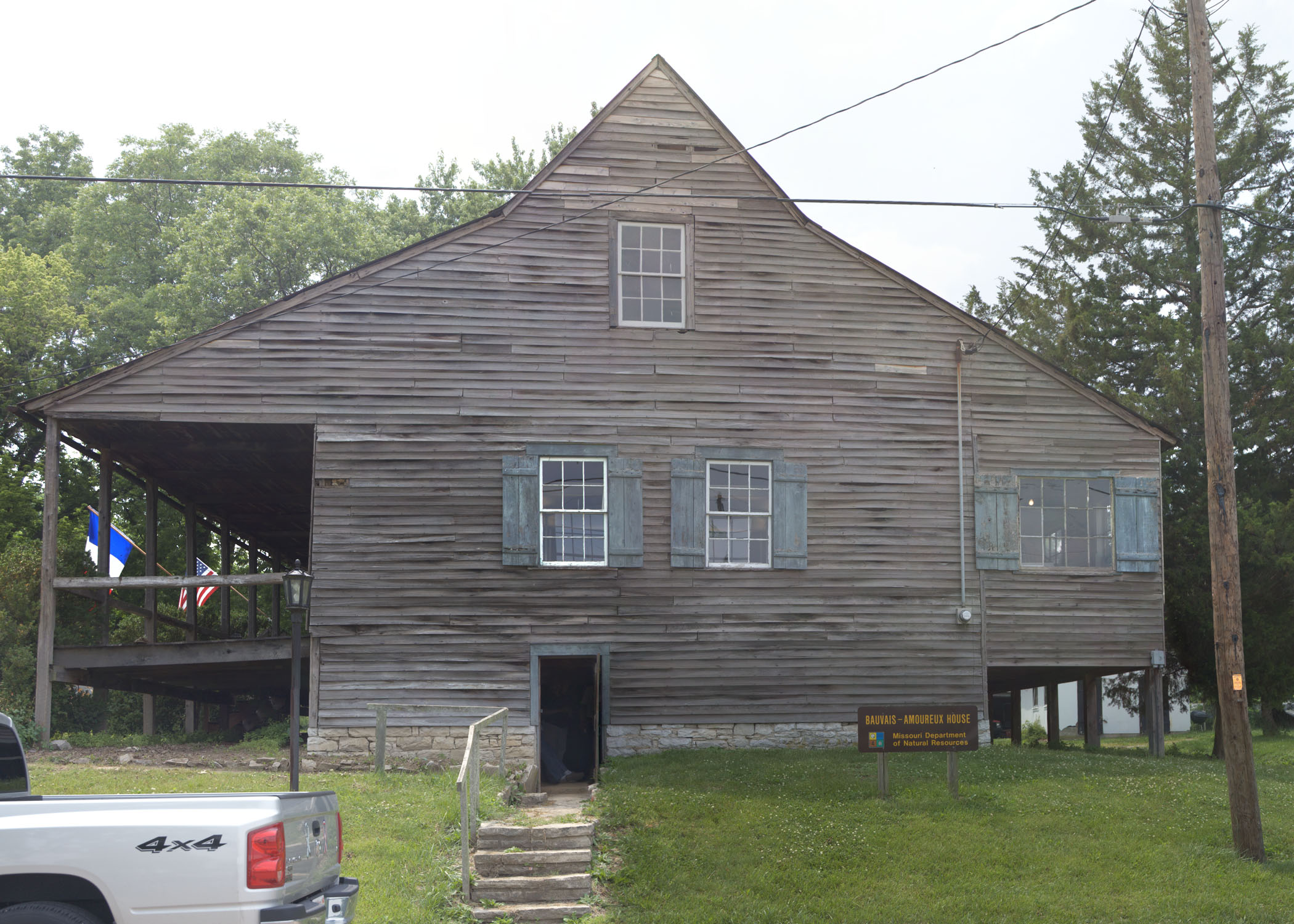
The East Side in 2007

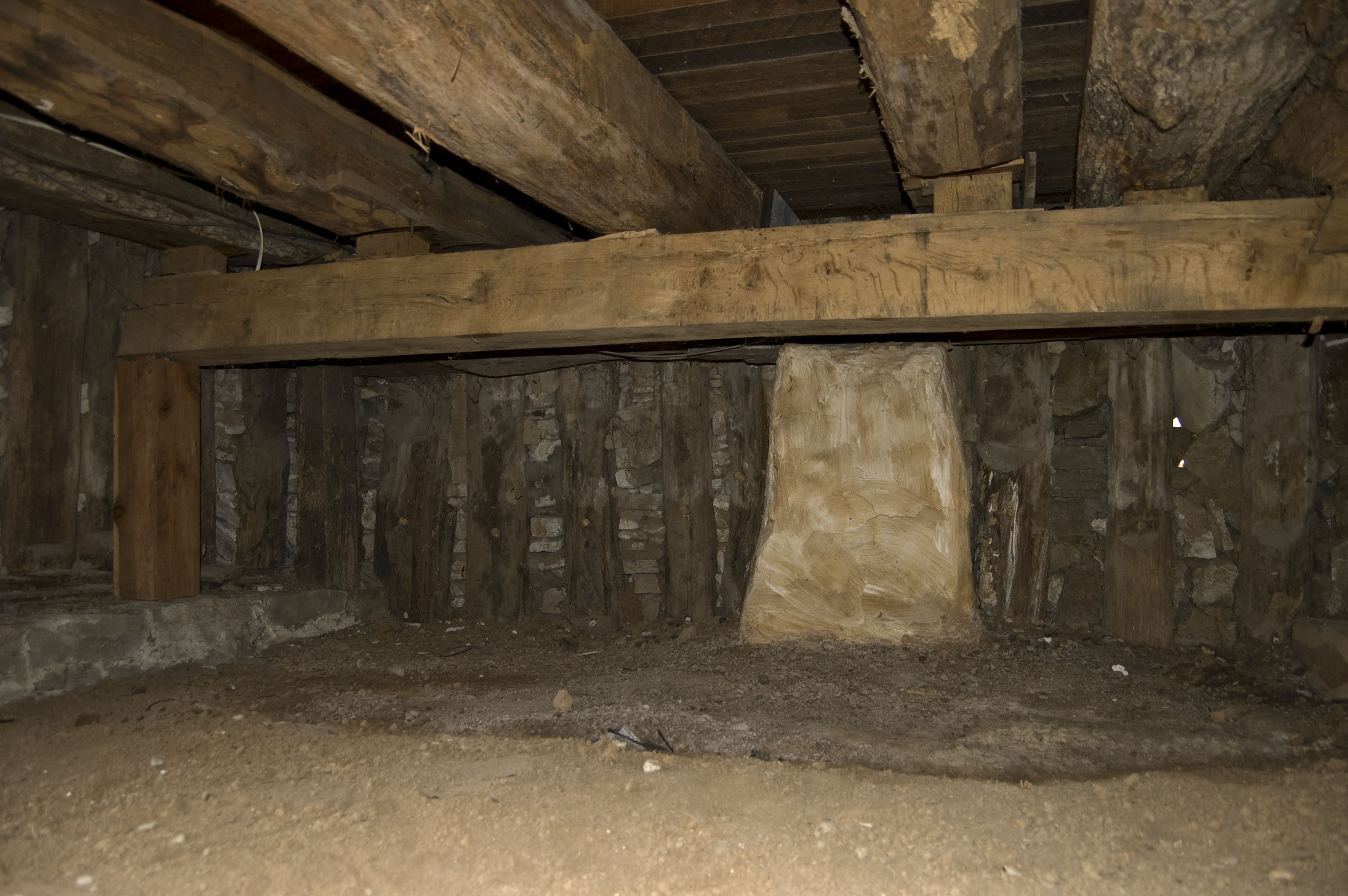
The poteaux-en-terre walls

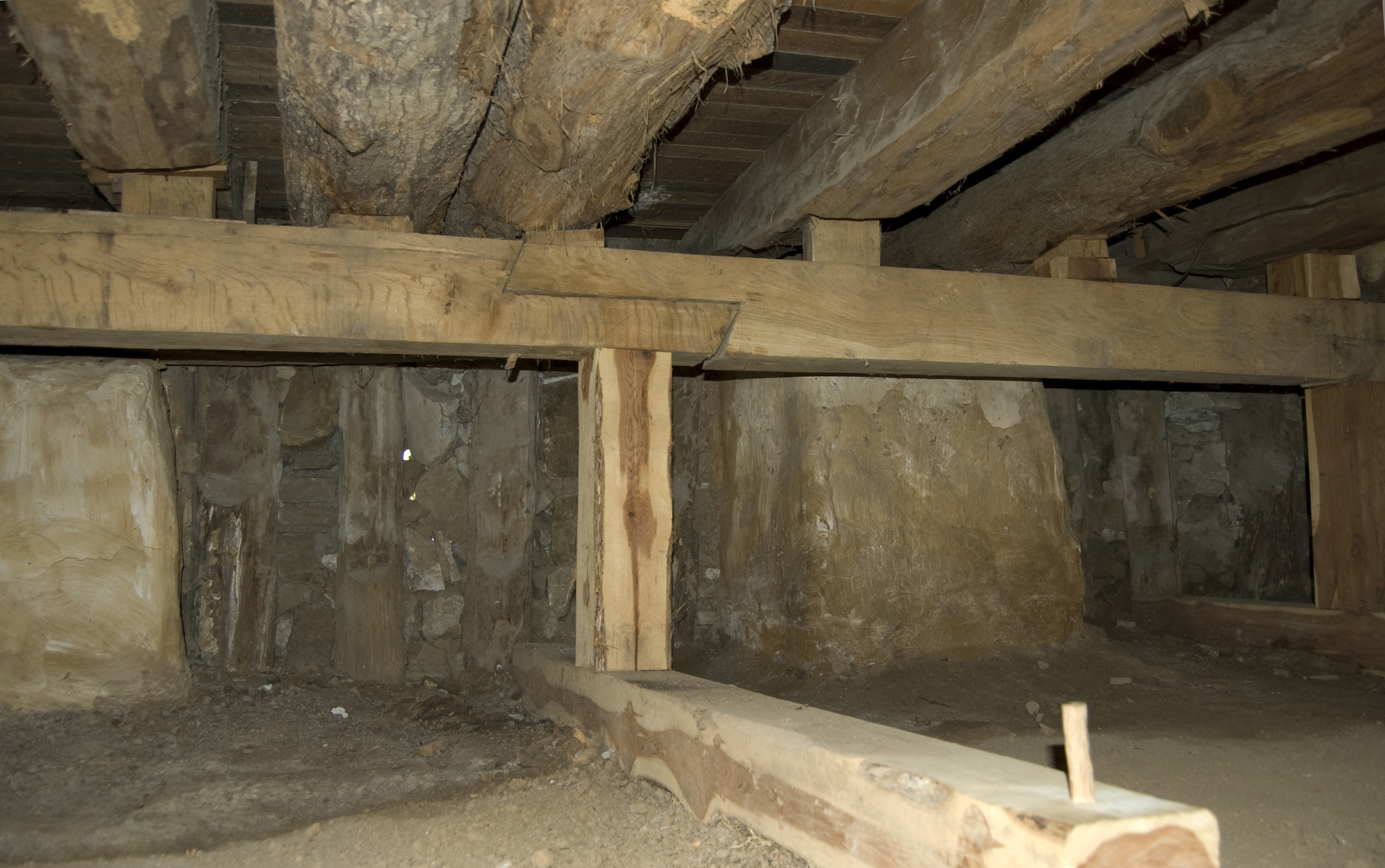
The floor support is independent of the log walls

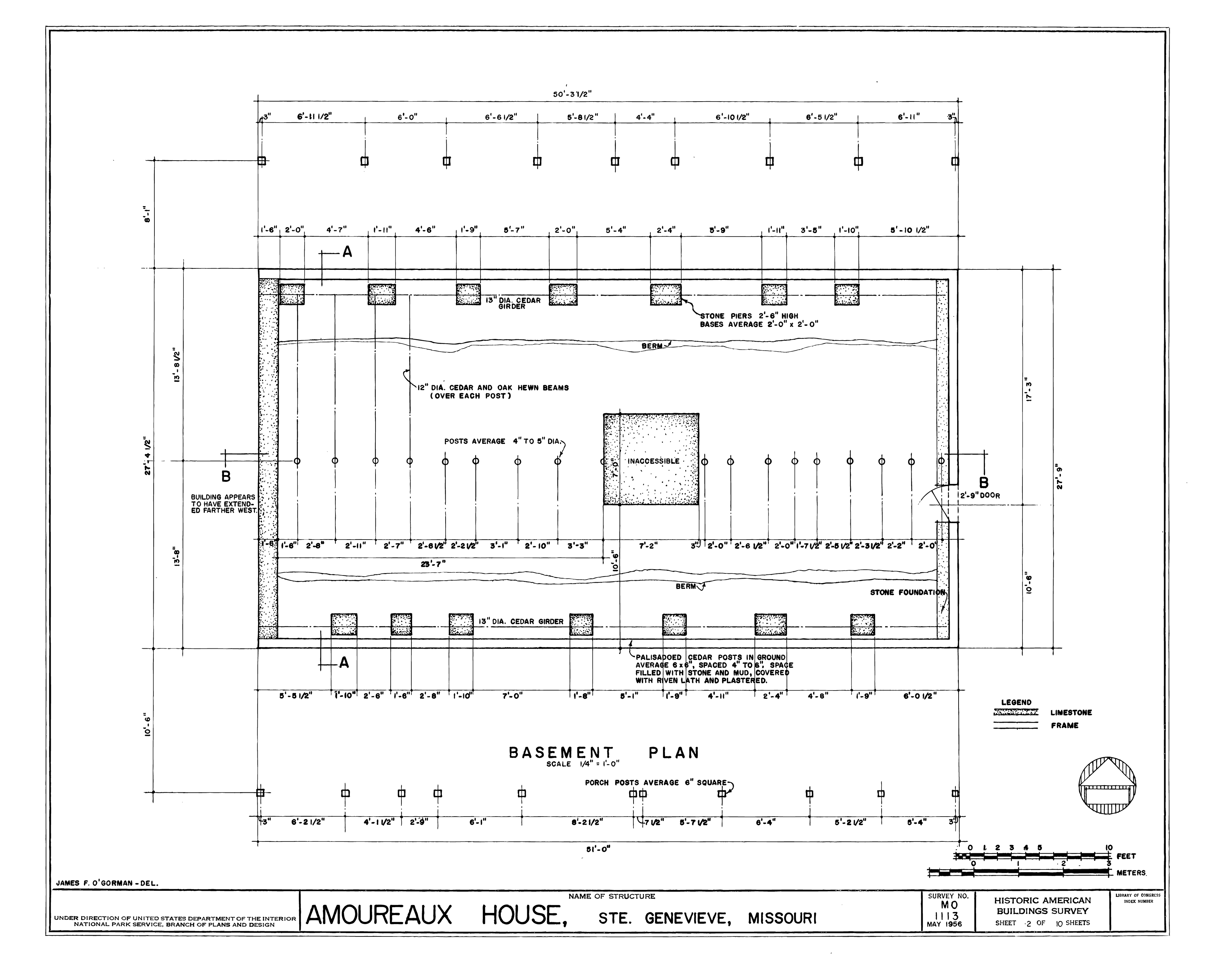
Plan of the basement and foundations of the Amoureux House

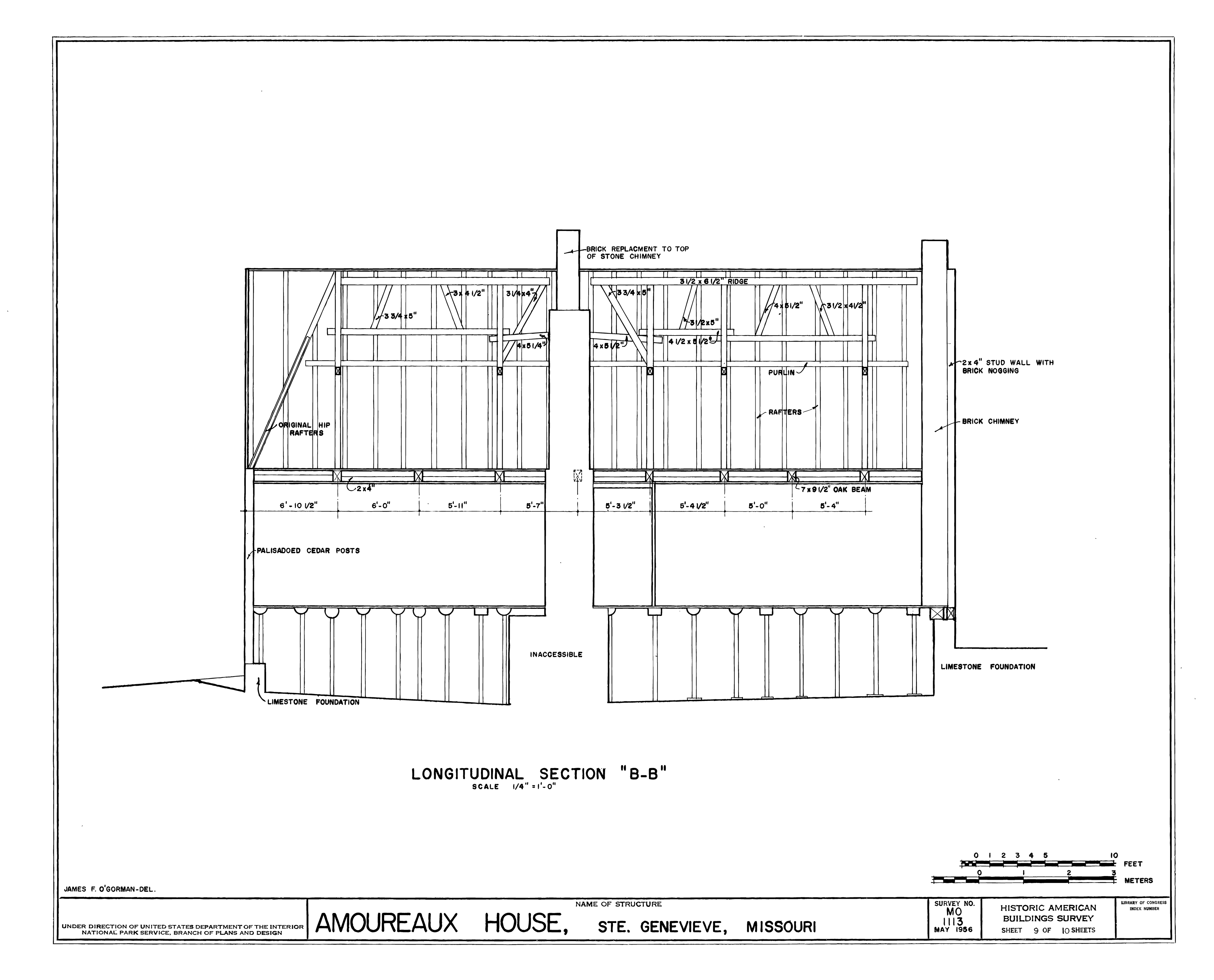
A longitudinal Section of the Amoureux House

=== Lasource–Durand Cabin ===
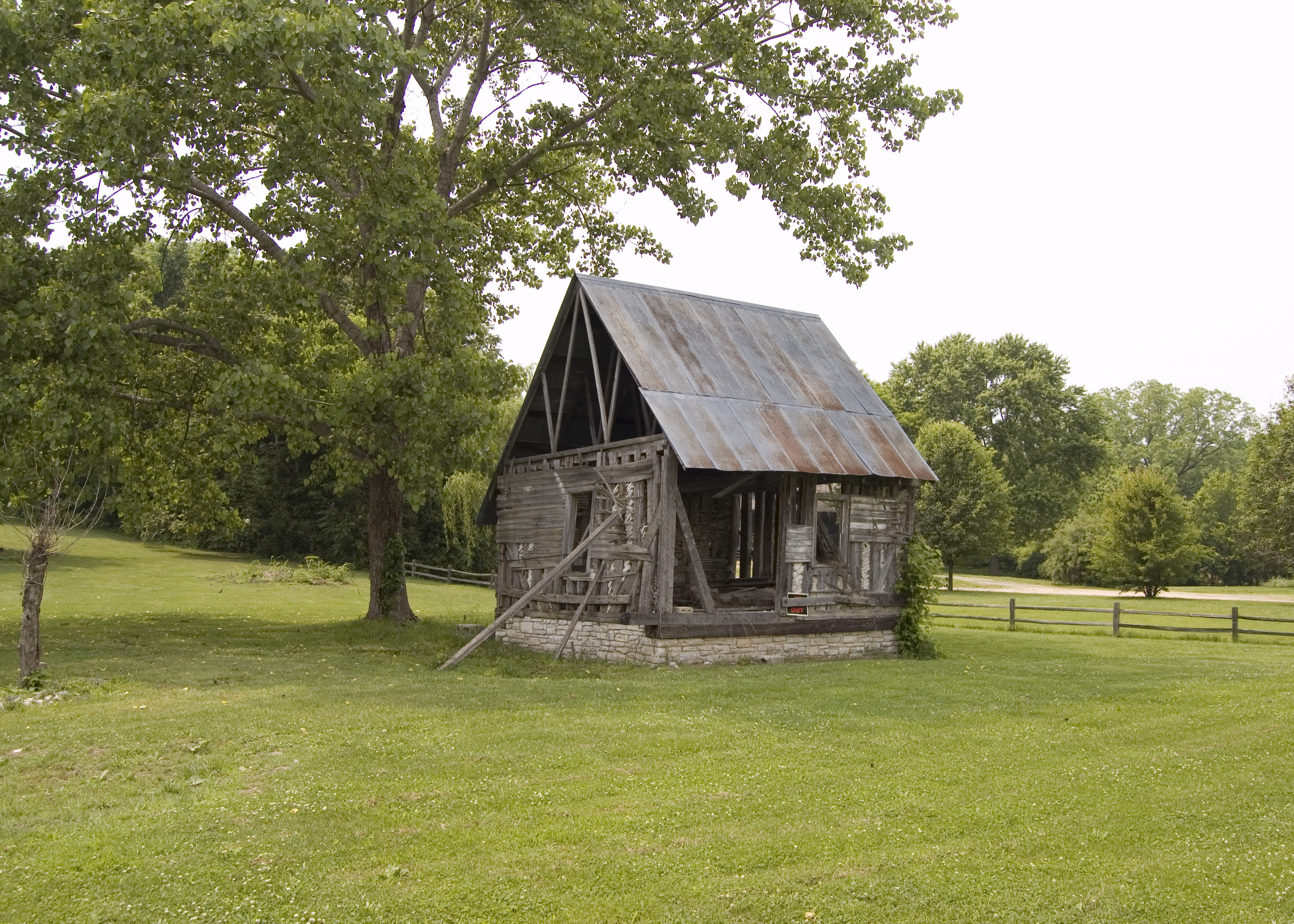
A 2007 photo of the Lasource–Durand Cabin

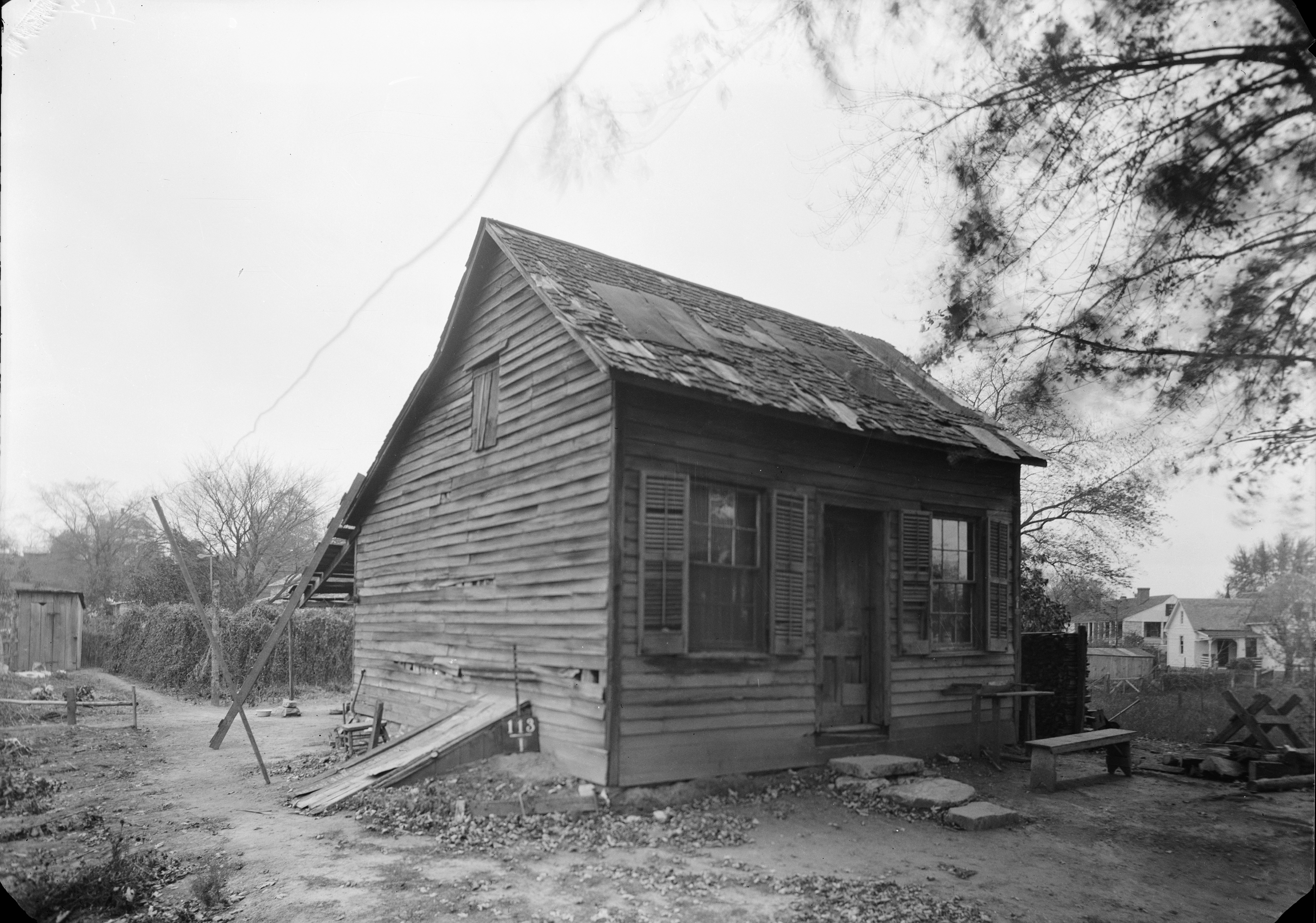
A 1936 photo of the Lasource–Durand Cabin behind the Amoureux House

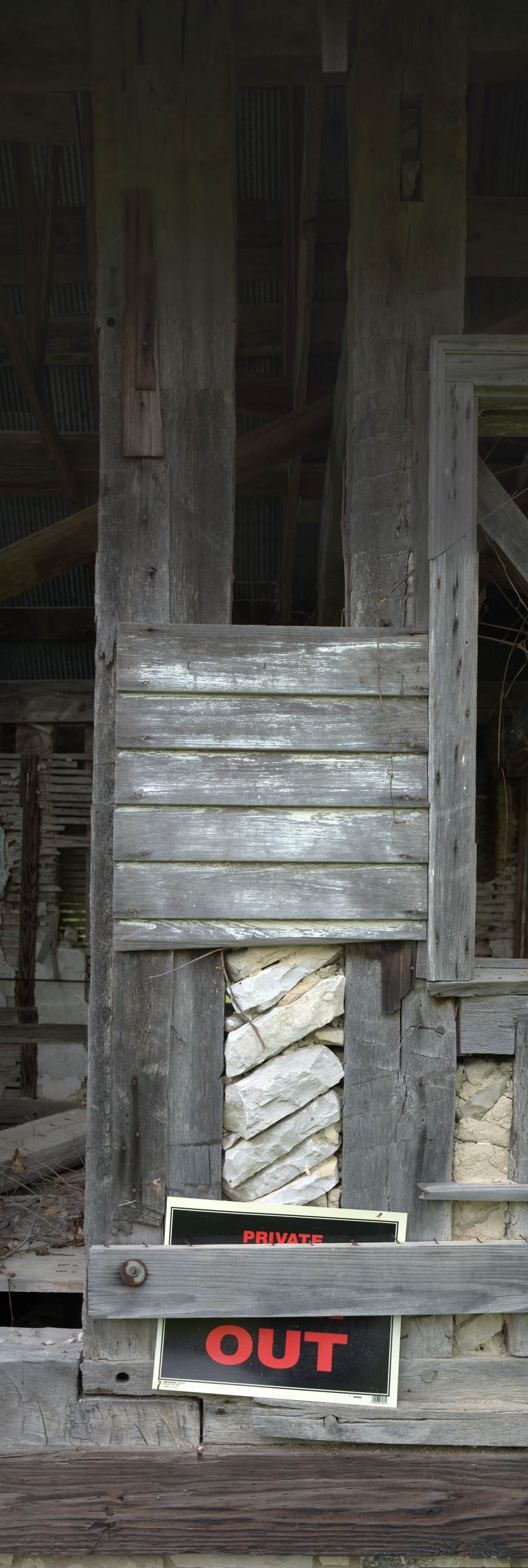
Pierrotage in the Lasource-Durand Cabin.

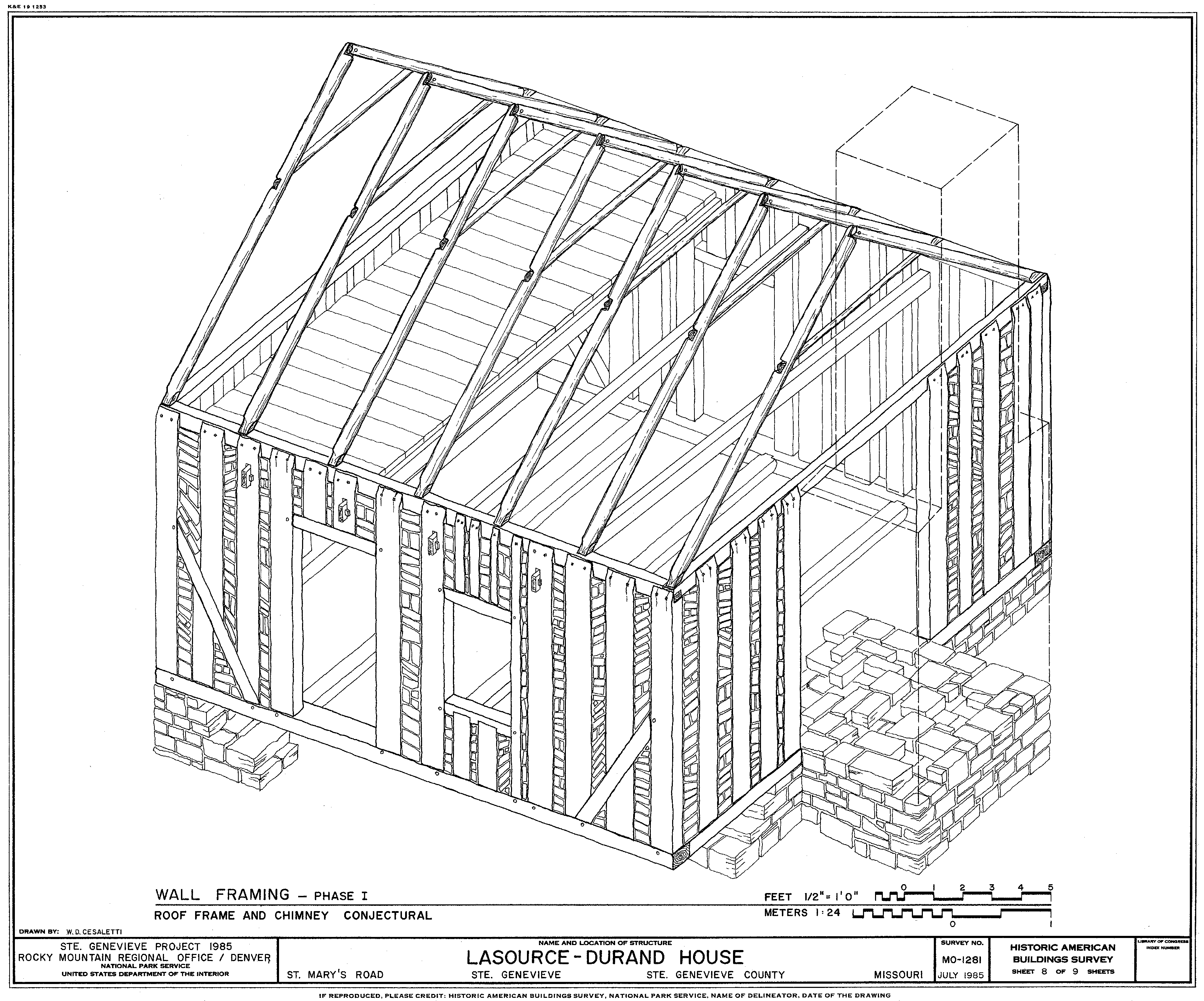
An isometric drawing of the Lasource-Durand Cabin
