= Spanish =

Spanish may refer to:

- Topics related to Spain:
  - Spaniards (Spanish people)
  - Spanish language
    - Spanish phonology
  - Spanish cuisine
  - Spanish history
  - Spanish culture
  - Languages of Spain, the various languages in Spain
  - Spanish Empire

== Other places ==
- Spanish, Ontario, Canada
- Spanish River (disambiguation), the name of several rivers
- Spanish Town, Jamaica

== Other uses ==
- John J. Spanish (1922–2019), American politician
- "Spanish" (song), a single by Craig David, 2003
- Spanish (goat breed), American goat breed

== See also ==
- Español (disambiguation)
- España (disambiguation)
- Espanola (disambiguation)
- Hispania, the Roman and Greek name for the Iberian Peninsula
- Hispanic, the people, nations, and cultures that have a historical link to Spain
- Hispanic (disambiguation)
- Hispanism
- Spain (disambiguation)
- National and regional identity in Spain
- Culture of Spain
- Spanish Fort (disambiguation)
