= Spanish people (disambiguation) =

Spanish people may refer to:

- in terms of ethnicity: all ethnic Spaniards, in and outside of Spain
- in territorial terms: people of Spain, entire population of Spain, historical or modern
- in modern legal terms: all people who poses the citizenship of Spain

== Other uses ==
- Spanish People's Party, a political party in Spain
- Spanish People's Union, a political party in Spain

== See also ==
- Spanish (disambiguation)
- Spain (disambiguation)
