= Wattle and daub =

Building technique using woven wooden supports packed with clay or mud

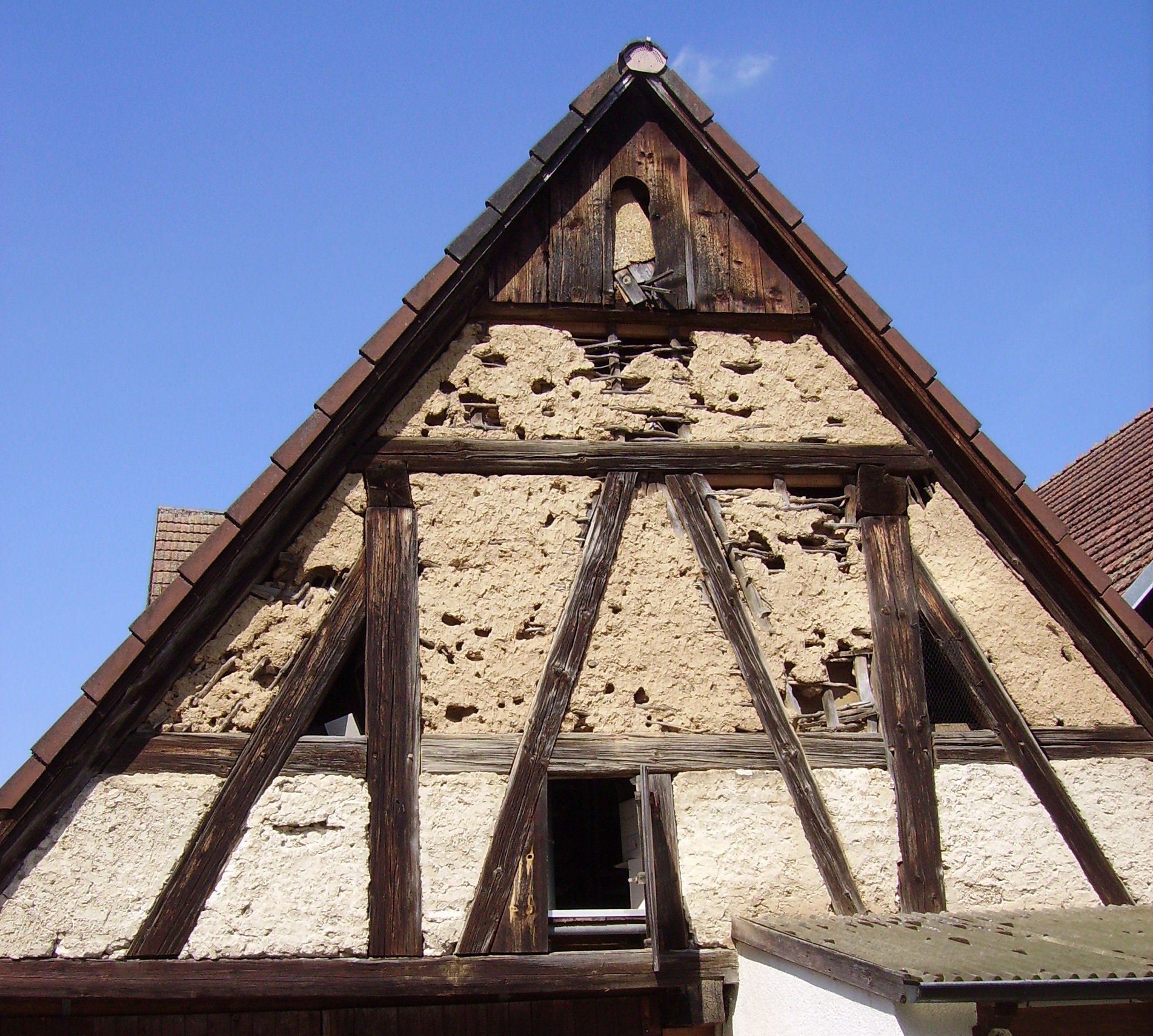
Wattle and daub in wooden frames

Wattle and daub is a composite building method in which a woven lattice of wooden strips called "wattle" is "daubed" with a sticky material usually made of some combination of wet soil, clay, sand, and straw. Wattle and daub has been used for at least 6,000 years and is still an important construction method in many parts of the world. Many historic buildings include wattle and daub construction.

== History ==
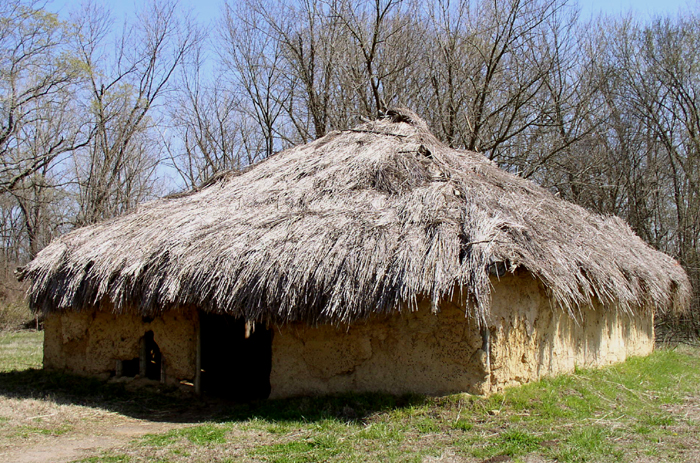
A wattle and daub house as used by people of the Mississippian culture

The wattle and daub technique has been used since the Neolithic period. It was common for houses of Linear pottery and Rössen cultures of middle Europe, but is also found in Western Asia (Çatalhöyük, Shillourokambos) as well as in North America (Mississippian culture) and South America (Brazil). In Africa it is common in the architecture of traditional houses such as those of the Ashanti people. Its usage dates back at least 6,000 years. There are suggestions that construction techniques such as lath and plaster and even cob may have evolved from wattle and daub. Fragments from prehistoric wattle and daub buildings have been found in Africa, Europe, Mesoamerica and North America.

Evidence for wattle and daub (or "wattle and reed") fire pits, storage bins, and buildings shows up in Egyptian archaeological sites such as Merimda and El Omari, dating back to the 5th millennium BCE, predating the use of mud brick and continuing to be the preferred building material until about the start of the First Dynasty (3100BCE). It continued to flourish well into the New Kingdom and beyond. Vitruvius refers to it as being employed in Rome. A review of English architecture especially reveals that the sophistication of this craft is dependent on the various styles of timber frame housing.

The wattle and plaster process has been replaced in modern architecture by brick and mortar or by lath and plaster, a common building material for wall and ceiling surfaces, in which a series of nailed wooden strips are covered with plaster smoothed into a flat surface. In many regions this building method has itself been overtaken by drywall construction using plasterboard sheets.

== Wattle ==
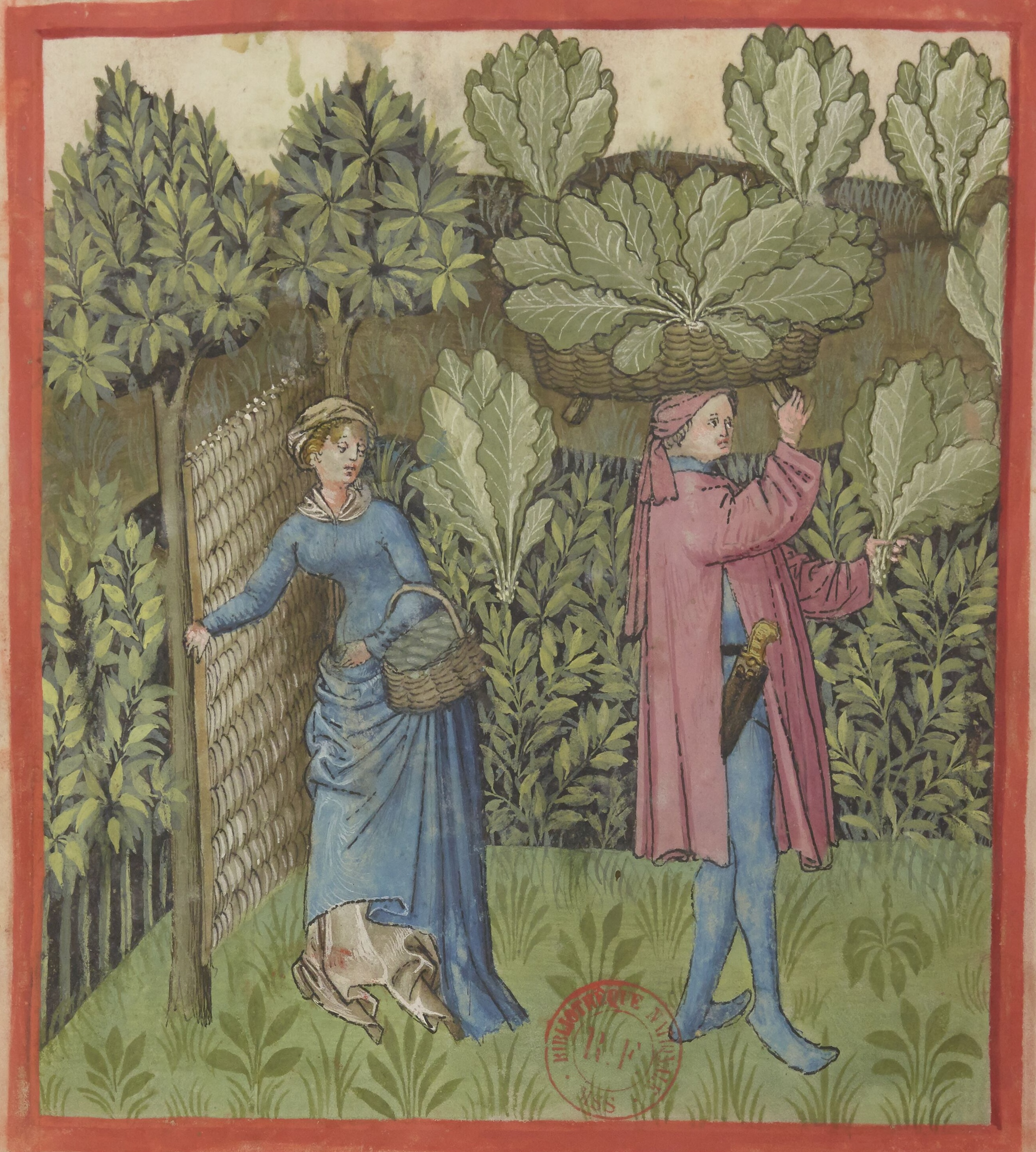
A woven wattle gate keeps animals out of a 15th-century cabbage patch. (Tacuinum Sanitatis, Rouen)

The wattle is made by weaving thin branches (either whole, or more usually split) or slats between upright stakes. The wattle may be made as loose panels, slotted between timber framing to make infill panels, or made in place to form the whole of a wall. In different regions, the material of wattle can be different. For example, at the Mitchell Site on the northern outskirts of the city of Mitchell, South Dakota, willow has been found as the wattle material of the walls of the house. Reeds and vines can also be used as wattle material. The origin of the term wattle describing a group of acacias in Australia, is derived from the common use of acacias as wattle in early Australian European settlements.

== Daub ==
Daub is usually created from a mixture of ingredients from three categories: binders, aggregates and reinforcement. Binders hold the mix together and can include clay, lime, chalk dust and limestone dust. Aggregates give the mix its bulk and dimensional stability through materials such as mud, sand, crushed chalk and crushed stone. Reinforcement is provided by straw, hair, hay or other fibrous materials, and helps to hold the mix together as well as to control shrinkage and provide flexibility. The daub may be mixed by hand, or by treading – either by humans or livestock. It is then applied to the wattle and allowed to dry, and often then whitewashed to increase its resistance to rain. Sometimes there can be more than one layer of daub. At the Mitchell Site, the anterior of the house had double layers of burned daub.

== Styles of infill panels ==
There were two popular choices for wattle and daub infill paneling: close-studded paneling and square paneling.

=== Close-studding ===
Close-studding panels create a much narrower space between the timbers: anywhere from 7 to 16 inches (18 to 40 cm). For this style of panel, weaving is too difficult, so the wattles run horizontally and are known as ledgers. The ledgers are sprung into each upright timber (stud) through a system of augered holes on one side and short chiseled grooves along the other. The holes (along with holes of square paneling) are drilled at a slight angle towards the outer face of each stud. This allows room for upright hazels to be tied to ledgers from the inside of the building. The horizontal ledgers are placed every two to three feet (0.6 to 0.9 metres) with whole hazel rods positioned upright top to bottom and lashed to the ledgers. These hazel rods are generally tied a finger-width apart with 6–8 rods each with a 16-inch (40 cm) width. Gaps allow key formation for drying.

=== Square panels ===
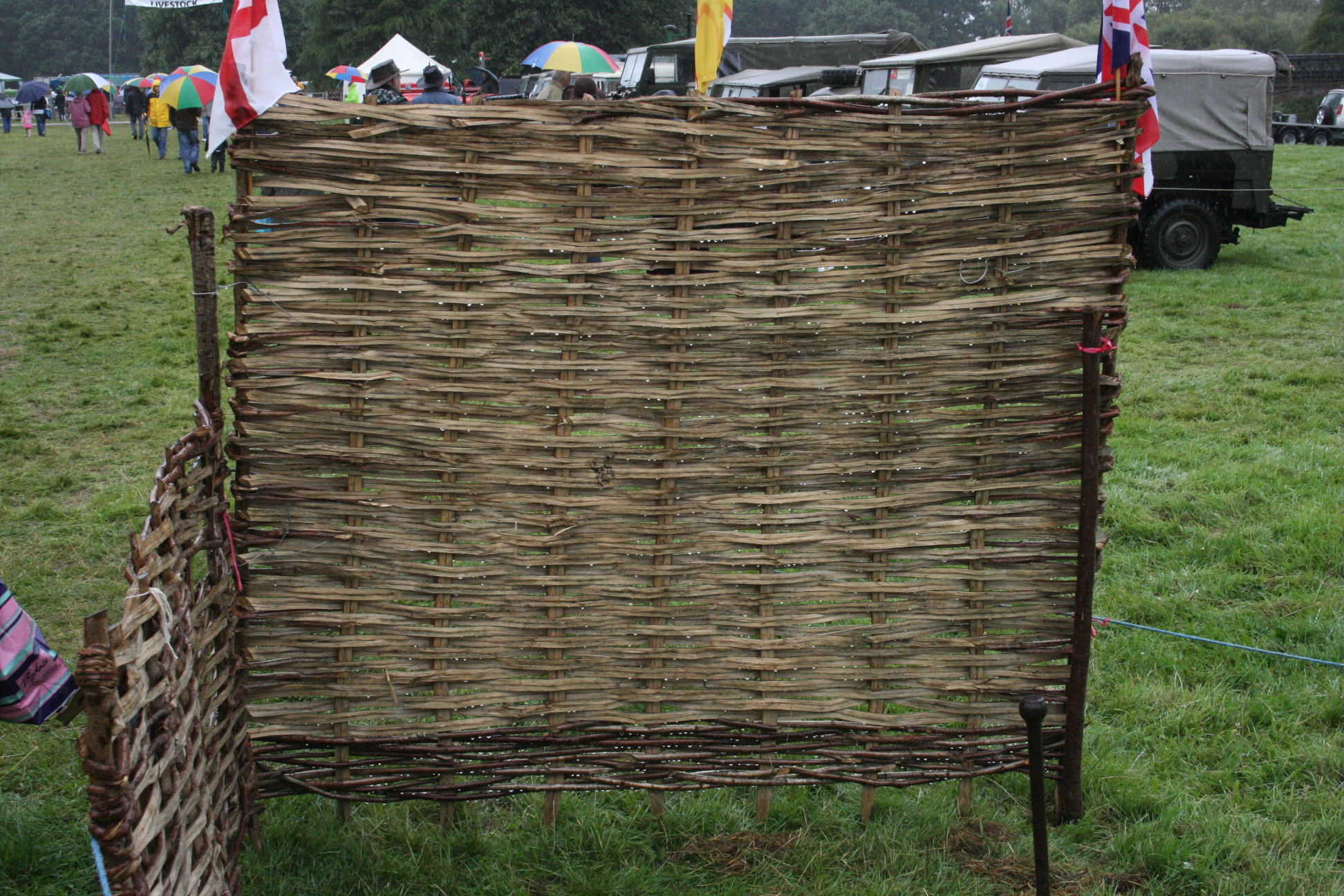
Wattle panel

Square panels are large, wide panels typical of some later timber-frame houses. These panels may be square in shape, or sometimes triangular to accommodate arched or decorative bracing. This style requires the wattles to be woven for better support of the daub.

To insert wattles in a square panel several steps are required. First, a series of evenly spaced holes are drilled along the middle of the inner face of each upper timber. Next, a continuous groove is cut along the middle of each inner face of the lower timber in each panel. Vertical slender timbers, known as staves, are then inserted and these hold the whole panel within the timber frame. The staves are positioned into the holes and then sprung into the grooves. They must be placed with sufficient gaps to weave the flexible horizontal wattles.

== Applications ==
In some places or cultures, the technique of wattle and daub was used with different materials and thus has different names.

=== Pug and pine ===
In the early days of the colonisation of South Australia, in areas where substantial timber was unavailable, pioneers' cottages and other small buildings were frequently constructed with light vertical timbers, which may have been "native pine" (Callitris or Casuarina spp.), driven into the ground, the gaps being stopped with pug (kneaded clay and grass mixture). Another term for this construction is palisade and pug.

=== Mud and stud ===
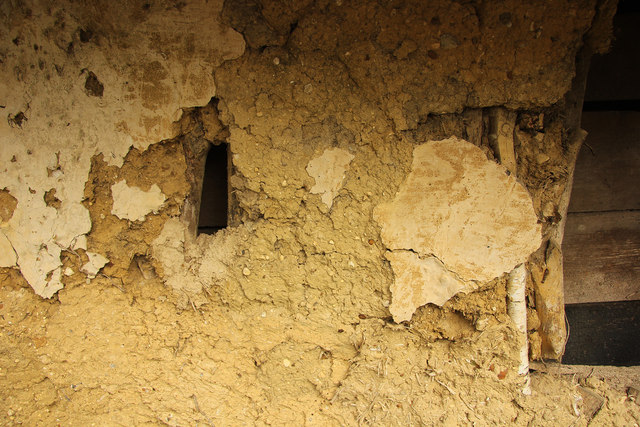
A mud and stud wall in Tumby Woodside, Lincolnshire

"Mud and stud" is a similar process to wattle and daub, with a simple frame consisting only of upright studs joined by cross rails at the tops and bottoms. Thin staves of ash were attached, then daubed with a mixture of mud, straw, hair and dung. The style of building was once common in Lincolnshire.

=== Pierrotage, columbage ===
Pierrotage is the infilling material used in French Vernacular architecture of the Southern United States to infill between half-timbering with diagonal braces, which is similar to daub. It is usually made of lime mortar clay mixed with small stones. It is also called bousillage or bouzillage, especially in French Vernacular architecture of Louisiana of the early 1700s. The materials of bousillage are Spanish moss or clay and grass. Bousillage also refers to the type of brick molded with the same materials and used as infilling between posts. Columbage refers to the timber-framed construction with diagonal bracing of the framework. Pierratage or bousillage is the material filled into the structural timbers.

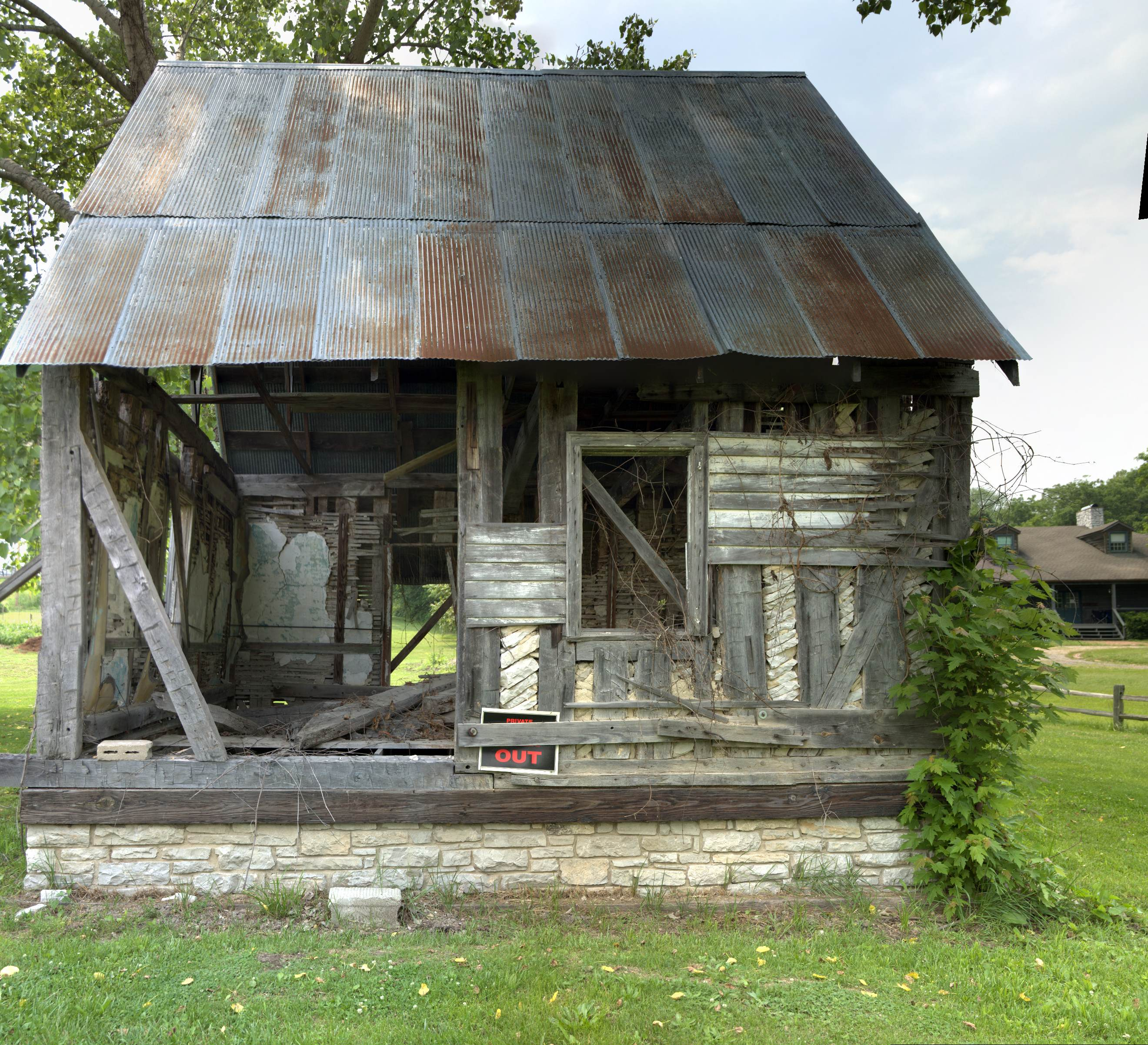
Example of pierrotage construction in Ste. Geneviève, Missouri.

=== Bajarreque ===
Bajarreque is a wall constructed with the technique of wattle and daub. The wattle here is made of bagasse, and the daub is the mix of clay and straw.

=== Jacal ===
Jacal can refer to a type of crude house whose wall is built with wattle and daub in southwestern US. Closely spaced upright sticks or poles driven into the ground with small branches (wattle) interwoven between them make the structural frame of the wall. Mud or an adobe clay (daub) is covered outside. To provide additional weather protection, the wall is usually plastered.

== See also ==
- Adobe
- Ceramic houses
- Clay panel
- Cob (building)
- Earthen plaster
- Lath and plaster
- Mudbrick
- Quincha
- Rammed earth
- Timber framing

== General and cited references ==
- Alex, Robert (May 1973). "Architectural features of houses at the Mitchell Site (39DV2), Eastern South Dakota". Plains Anthropologist. 18 (60): 149–159. doi:10.1080/2052546.1973.11908658. JSTOR 25667144.
- Harris, Cyril M. (2006). Dictionary of Architecture and Construction (4th ed.). New York: McGraw-Hill. ISBN 9780071452373. OCLC 59360211.
