= Spane =

Spane may refer to:

- Spain (surname), an English surname
- Robert J. Spane (born 1940), American vice admiral
- Spane, a character from the 1937 American film The Devil's Saddle Legion
- Sonia Spane, a character in the 1987 film series Watch the Shadows Dance
- Scale of Positive and Negative Experience, a scale for the assessment of wellbeing developed by Ed Diener

== See also ==
- Spain (disambiguation)
