= España (disambiguation) =

España is the Spanish name of Spain, a country in southwestern Europe.

España may also refer to:

== Arts and entertainment ==
- España (Chabrier), an 1883 orchestral piece
  - España, a derivative 1886 waltz by Émile Waldteufel
- España 1936, a Spanish documentary film

== Places ==
- España Lake, Bolivia
- España Boulevard, Philippines
- España station, a railway station in the Philippines
- España, a light rail station in Guadalajara, Mexico

== People ==
- Eduardo España (born 1971), Mexican actor

== Political parties ==
- España 2000, Spain

== Ships ==
- España-class battleships of the Spanish Navy
  - Spanish battleship España (1913–1923)
  - Spanish battleship Alfonso XIII (later España, 1915–1937)

== Sports teams ==
- Real C.D. España, Honduras
- España F.C., El Salvador
- Club España, United States
- Real Club España, Mexico

== See also ==
- Spain (disambiguation)
- Español (disambiguation)
- Spanish (disambiguation)
- Espanola (disambiguation)
