= Spanish Fort =

Spanish Fort or Old Spanish Fort may refer to:

== United States ==
- Spanish Fort, Alabama, a city
- Spanish Fort (Colorado), a Spanish military post built near Sangre de Cristo Pass in 1819
- Spanish Fort (New Orleans), Louisiana, listed on the U.S. National Register of Historical Places (NRHP)
- Spanish Fort Site (Holly Bluff, Mississippi), NRHP-listed
- Old Spanish Fort (Pascagoula, Mississippi), NRHP-listed
- Old Spanish Fort Archeological Site, NRHP-listed in Missouri
- Spanish Fort, Texas, a community and NRHP-listed fort site

== Micronesia ==
- Spanish Fort (Yap), NRHP-listed
