= Español (surname) =

Español is a Spanish-language surname meaning Spanish. Notable people with the surname include:

- Albert Español (born 1985), Spanish water polo player
- Carlos Pau y Español (1857–1937), Spanish botanist
- Luis Español (born 1964), Spanish writer and translator
- Malena Español, Argentine-American mathematician

== See also ==
- Español (disambiguation)
- English (surname)
