= Español =

Español may refer to:

- From or pertaining to Spain
- Spanish language
- Spanish people
- Djudeo-Espanyol or Judaeo-Spanish, a language spoken by Jews
- Argant, an ancient variety of red wine grape alternatively named Espagnol
- RCD Espanyol
- Club Social, Deportivo y Cultural Español
- Central Español
- Español (surname)

== See also ==
- Spanish (disambiguation)
- Spain (disambiguation)
- España (disambiguation)
- Espanola (disambiguation)
