= Spanish River =

Spanish River may refer to:

- Spanish River (Alabama)
- Spanish River (Florida), a river in Boca Raton, Florida
- Spanish River (Jamaica)
- Spanish River (Ontario), a major river in Northern Ontario
