= Between the Trees =

American rock band

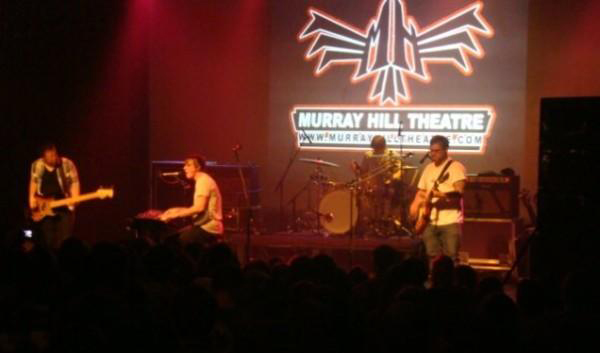
- Between The Trees performing in Jacksonville, Florida in 2009.

Background information
- Origin: Orlando, Florida, United States
- Genres: Alternative Rock, indie rock, pop punk
- Years active: 2005–2010
- Labels: Bonded Records (2006); Universal Republic (2007)
- Past members: Ryan Kirkland; Josh Butler; Jeremy Butler; Stevie Benz; Brad Kriebel; Wes Anderson; Josh Jove; Jordan Cole; Andrew Wilson
- Website: betweenthetrees.net

Between the Trees was an American rock band from Orlando, Florida, formed in 2005. The band consisted of vocalist/guitarist Ryan Kirkland, lead guitarist Brad Kriebel, drummer Josh Butler and bassist Jeremy Butler.

Between the Trees released their debut album through Bonded Records in 2006, entitled The Story and the Song. In 2007, they signed to The Universal Motown/Universal Republic Group, but it was later announced that the band/label relationship had fallen through, and their next album was to be self-released. Their second album was entitled Spain and was released on August 11, 2009.

== History ==
=== Formation and The Story and the Song (2005–2006) ===
Formed in early 2005, in the east side of Orlando, Florida, Between the Trees began with lead vocalist Ryan Kirkland and brothers Josh and Jeremy Butler. Not long after, in Spring of 2005, they chose a keyboardist, Wes Anderson, Realizing a need for another guitarist, the band soon recruited Brad Kriebel, who was a close friend. After finalizing the line up, they began to write and collaborate different styles of music.

After graduating from their respective high schools, Between the Trees released their first album, The Story and the Song, on September 19, 2006, through the independent label Bonded Records. The band's first single was "The Way She Feels", with the music video first being released on May 14, 2006. The song first received radio airplay in the United States on May 27, 2007.

Between the Trees was involved with the non-profit organization To Write Love on Her Arms, which is dedicated to providing help to those who struggle with depression, addiction, self-injury, and suicide. Two songs on their first album are based upon the organization, and the subsequent problems that it hopes to solve. The band's debut record also covered various other elements, featuring themes of romance, introspection, relationships, and even a song about the band's fans (opener "The Forward").

=== Record labels and Spain (2007–present) ===
In early August 2007, the band announced via their MySpace, that they had signed with record label Universal Motown Republic. The announcement came two weeks after their appearance on the Vans Warped Tour. Prior to the release of their second album, the band's bassist Jeremy Butler stated on AbsolutePunk.net that Between the Trees had parted ways with the label and had decided to distribute the record themselves.

In August 2008, Brad Kriebel and the band parted ways due to creative differences. They temporarily replaced him with lead guitarist Josh Jove. Also, on June 3, 2009 the band announced the departure of Wes Anderson. His desire to venture in a different direction was stated as his reason of departure.

Between the Trees announced the confirmed release of their second album, entitled Spain, which was released on August 11, 2009. The first single off the album is "We Can Try", with a music video being officially released on August 28, 2009.

Between the Trees released the Winter EP, their first EP at the moment. It was only available on dates of their Winter 09' shows. But they have said that at some point it will be available for purchase online, until then the songs are available on YouTube. On September 8, 2010 Between The Trees announced that by the end of the year, they will disband.

"It is with regret that I announce that Between The Trees will be disbanding by the end of this year. It's not a decision that we all fully agree with, but it's a decision that is final."

The band also announced that their long-time touring guitarist Stevie Benz would be joining the band as an official member.

On December 23, 2011, Ryan Kirkland released "You Showed Up" for his church's Christmas theme.

=== Farewell Shows ===
The band performed two farewell shows at "The Social" in downtown Orlando, FL on December 6 and 7, 2010. Aaron Gillespie (of The Almost) performed as an opening act.

== Band members ==
=== Former ===
- Ryan Kirkland – Guitar, lead vocals, keyboards
- Josh Butler – Drums
- Jeremy Butler – Bass guitar
- Andrew Kelly - Guitar, vocals
- Stevie Benz – Guitar, background vocals (currently in Gwar)
- Brad Kriebel – Guitar
- Wes Anderson – Keyboards, Percussion

=== Touring Musicians ===
- Josh Jove – (former) Guitar, background vocals
- Jordan Ensminger – (former) Guitar, background vocals

== Discography ==
=== Studio albums ===
- 2006: The Story and the Song
- 2009: Spain U.S. No. 138

=== Extended play ===
- 2009: Winter EP
