= Hispano (disambiguation) =

Hispano or Hispanic refers to something or someone from Spain or a Spanish-speaking country.

Hispano or Hispanos may also refer to:

  - Hispanos of New Mexico
- Hispano FC, a Honduran football team
- Los Hispanos (Colombian band)
- Los Hispanos (quartet), a Puerto Rican vocal quartet
- Tata Hispano, a Spanish manufacturer of bus and coach bodies
- Hispano-Suiza, a Spanish automotive-engineering company and aviation component manufacturer

== See also ==
- Hispanic (disambiguation)
