= The Story and the Song =

Studio album by Between the Trees
- Released: September 19, 2006
- Recorded: 2006
- Genre: Indie rock
- Length: 45:03
- Label: Bonded

Between the Trees chronology
The Story and the Song (2006)	Spain (2009)

Singles from The Story and the Song
- 1. "The Way She Feels" Released: May 14, 2007

Professional ratings
Review scores
Source	Rating
AllMusic	4/5 stars
Jesus Freak Hideout	4.5/5 stars

The Story and the Song is the first album from Orlando-based rock band Between the Trees and debuted on September 19, 2006. The band dedicated "A Time For Yohe" and "The Way She Feels" to Renee Yohe, a recovered addict who inspired the creation of To Write Love on Her Arms.

== Release ==
In conjunction with David McKenna of Bonded Records, the September 18, 2006 album release proved tremendously successful. A subsequent distribution contract with Universal Fontana further increased the album's popularity.

== Track listing ==
1. "The Forward" - 3:37
2. "White Lines & Red Lights" - 3:53
3. "The Way She Feels" - 3:44
4. "Words" - 3:46
5. "The Greatest of These (A Little Love)" - 3:53
6. "Darlin'" - 4:31
7. "A Time for Yohe" - 4:01
8. "She Is..." - 4:46
9. "Fairweather" - 3:25
10. "The Fort" - 4:12
11. "You Cry a Tear to Start a River" - 5:35
