= Post in ground =

Type of construction with vertical, roof-bearing timbers

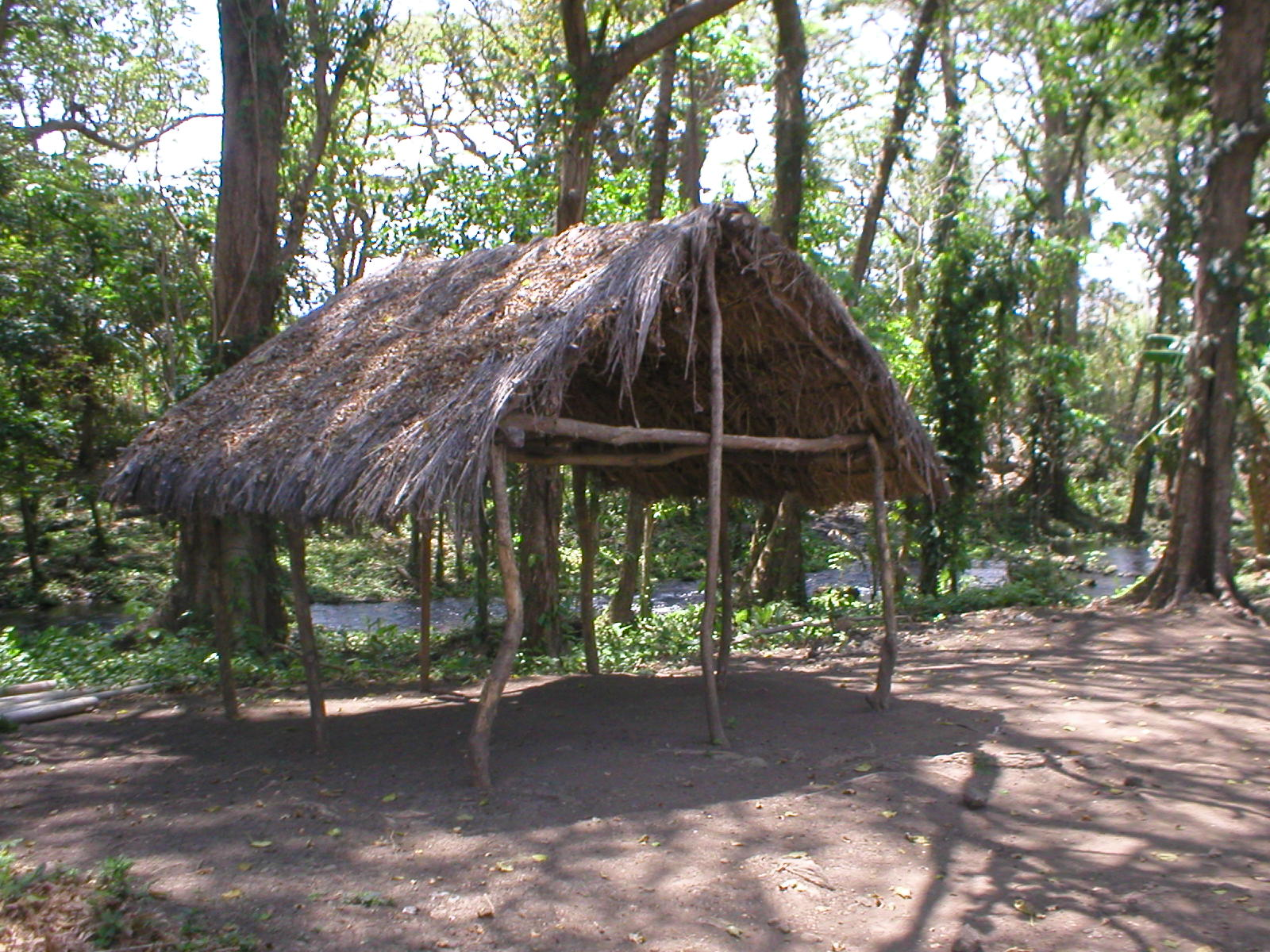
An earthfast shelter. The posts are buried in the ground so no bracing is necessary.

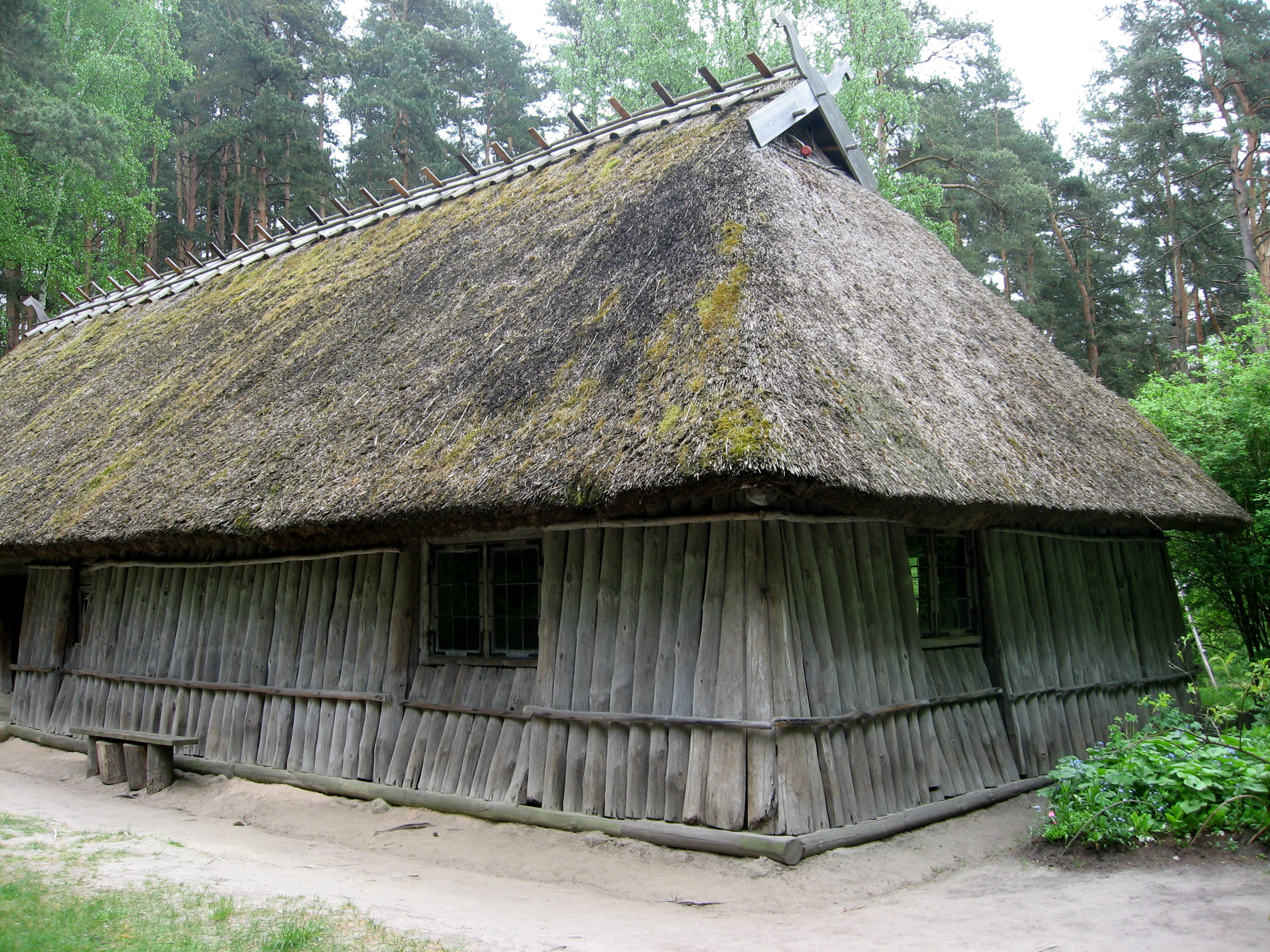
Some researchers consider sills placed on the ground, rather than on a foundation, to fall under the type earthfast construction. Fishing house without a chimney, circa 1750. The Ethnographic Open-Air Museum of Latvia

A post in ground construction, also called earthfast or hole-set posts, is a type of construction in which vertical, roof-bearing timbers, called posts, are in direct contact with the ground. They may be placed into excavated postholes, driven into the ground, or on sills which are set on the ground without a foundation. Earthfast construction is common from the Neolithic period to the present and is used worldwide. Post-in-the-ground construction is sometimes called an "impermanent" form, used for houses which are expected to last a decade or two before a better quality structure can be built.

Post in ground construction can also include sill on grade, wood-lined cellars, and pit houses. Most pre-historic and medieval wooden dwellings worldwide were built post in ground.

== History ==
This type of construction is often believed to be an intermediate form between a palisade construction and a stave construction. Because the postholes are easily detected in archaeological surveys, they can be distinguished from the other two.

The Japanese also used a type of earthfast construction until the eighteenth century, which they call Hottate-bashira (literally "embedded pillars").

The Dogon people in Africa use post in ground construction for their toguna, community gathering places typically located in the center of villages for official and informal meetings.

== Poteaux-en-terre ==
In the historical region of New France in North America, poteaux-en-terre was a historic style of earthfast timber framing. This method is similar to poteaux-sur-sol, but the boulin (hewn posts) are planted in the ground rather than landing on a sill plate. The spaces between the boulin are filled with bousillage (reinforced mud) or pierrotage (stones and mud). One extant example of post in ground construction is the Bequtte-Ribault House in Ste. Genevieve, Missouri. There is also archeological evidence of similar houses in St. Louis near the original boat landing.

=== Gallery of poteaux-en-terre ===
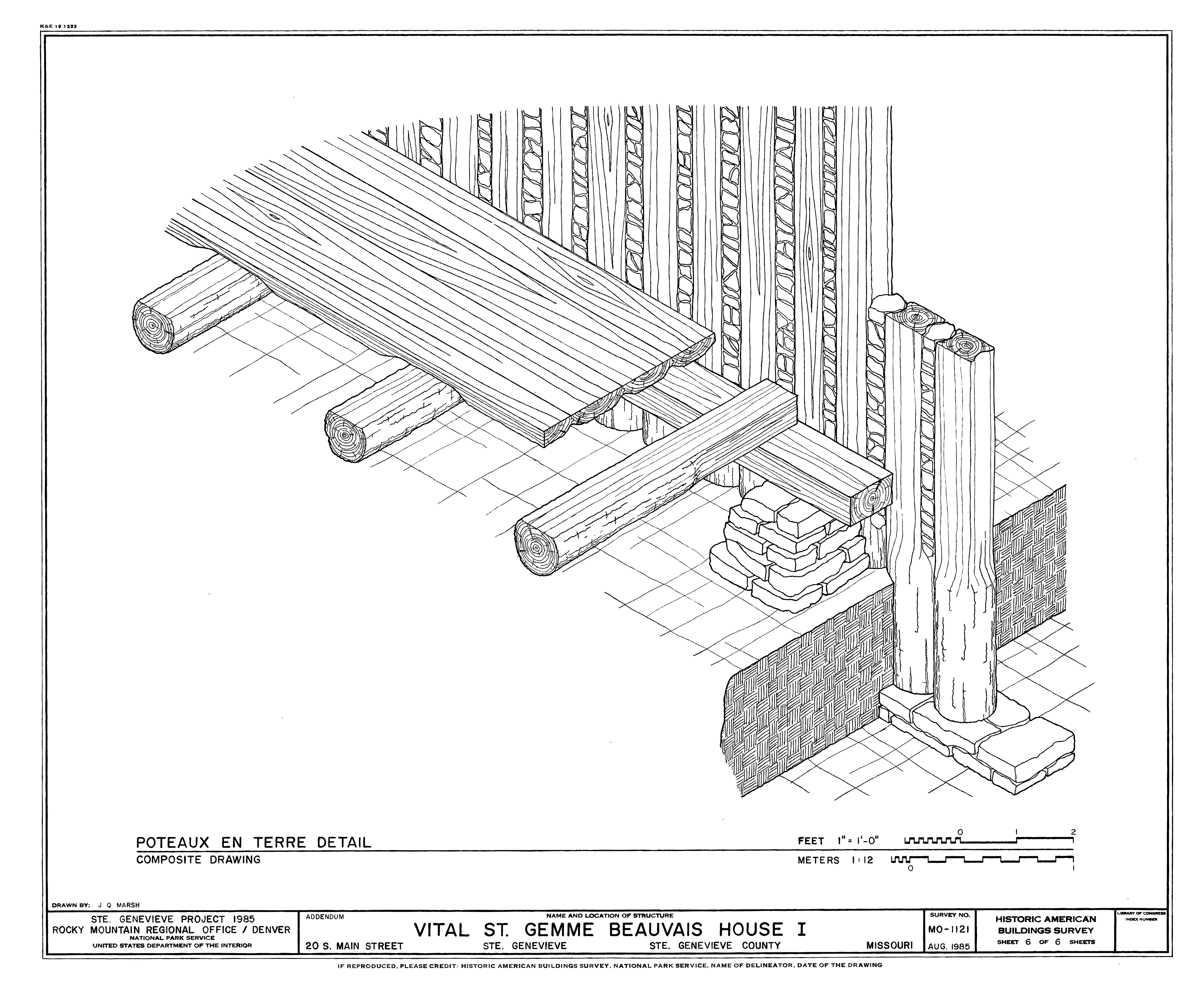
Drawing of poteaux-en-terre in the Beauvais House in Ste. Genevieve, Missouri

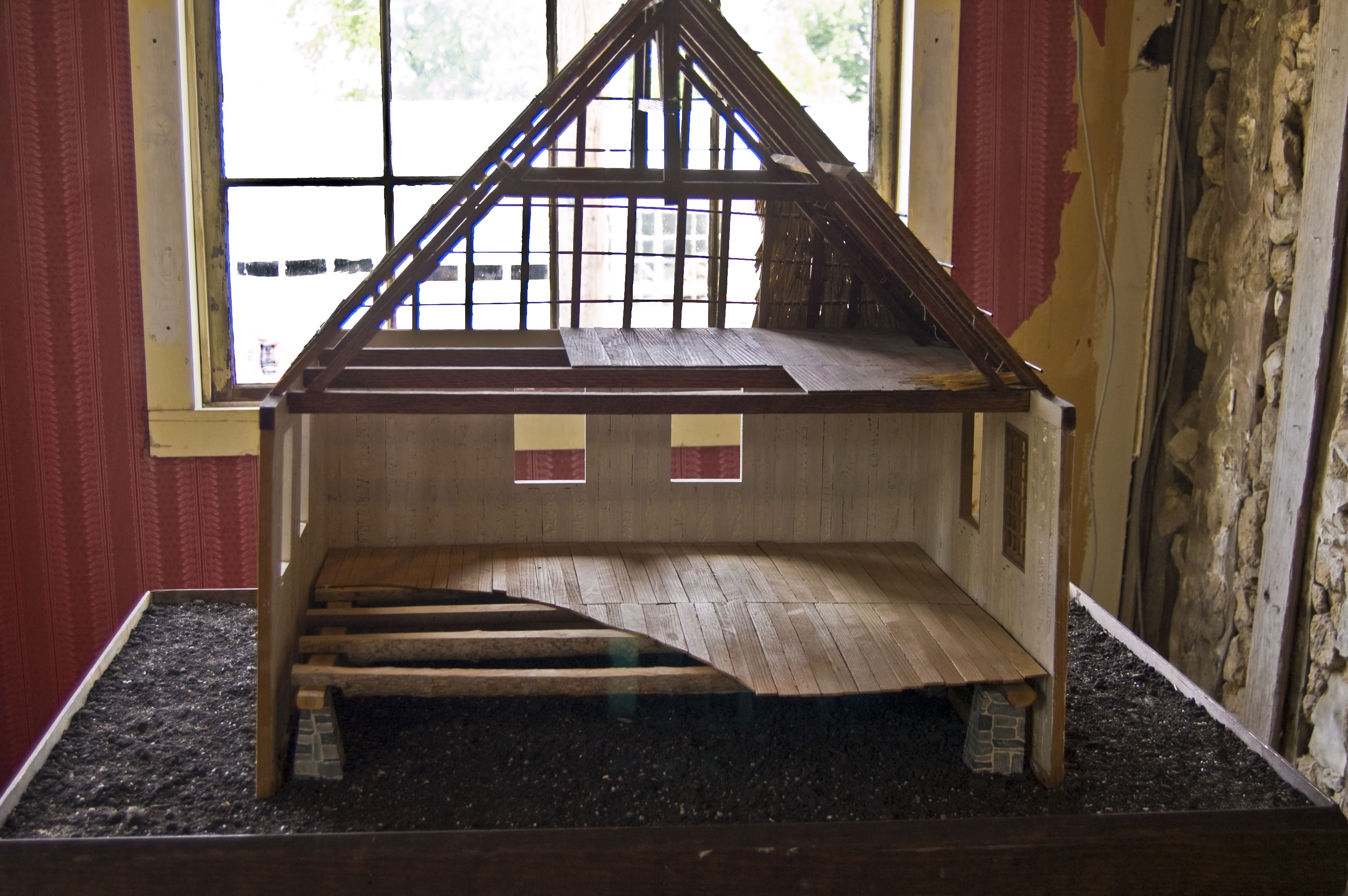
A cross section of a poteaux-en-terre house.

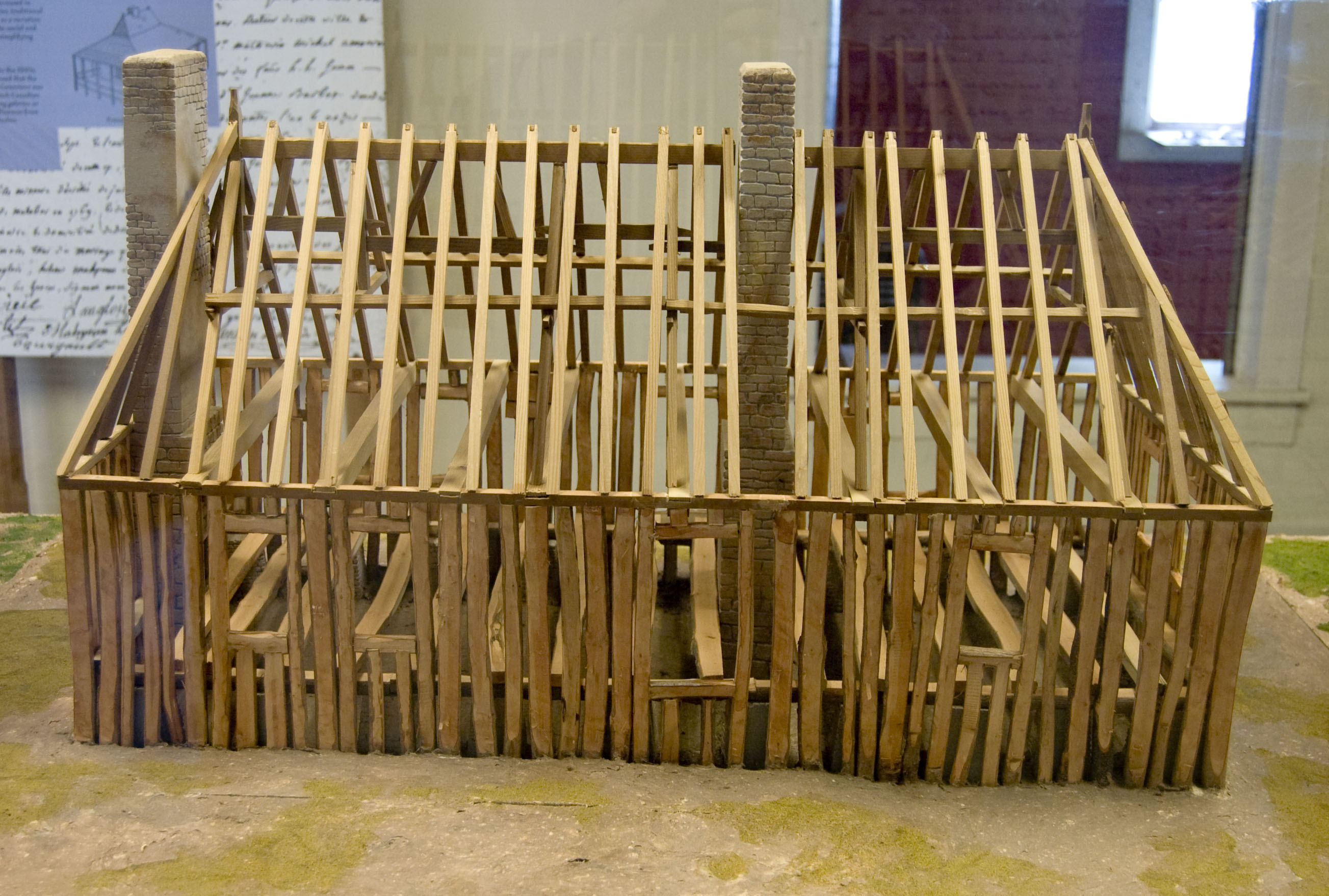
A model of the Beauvais-Amoureux House, showing poteaux-en-terre construction.

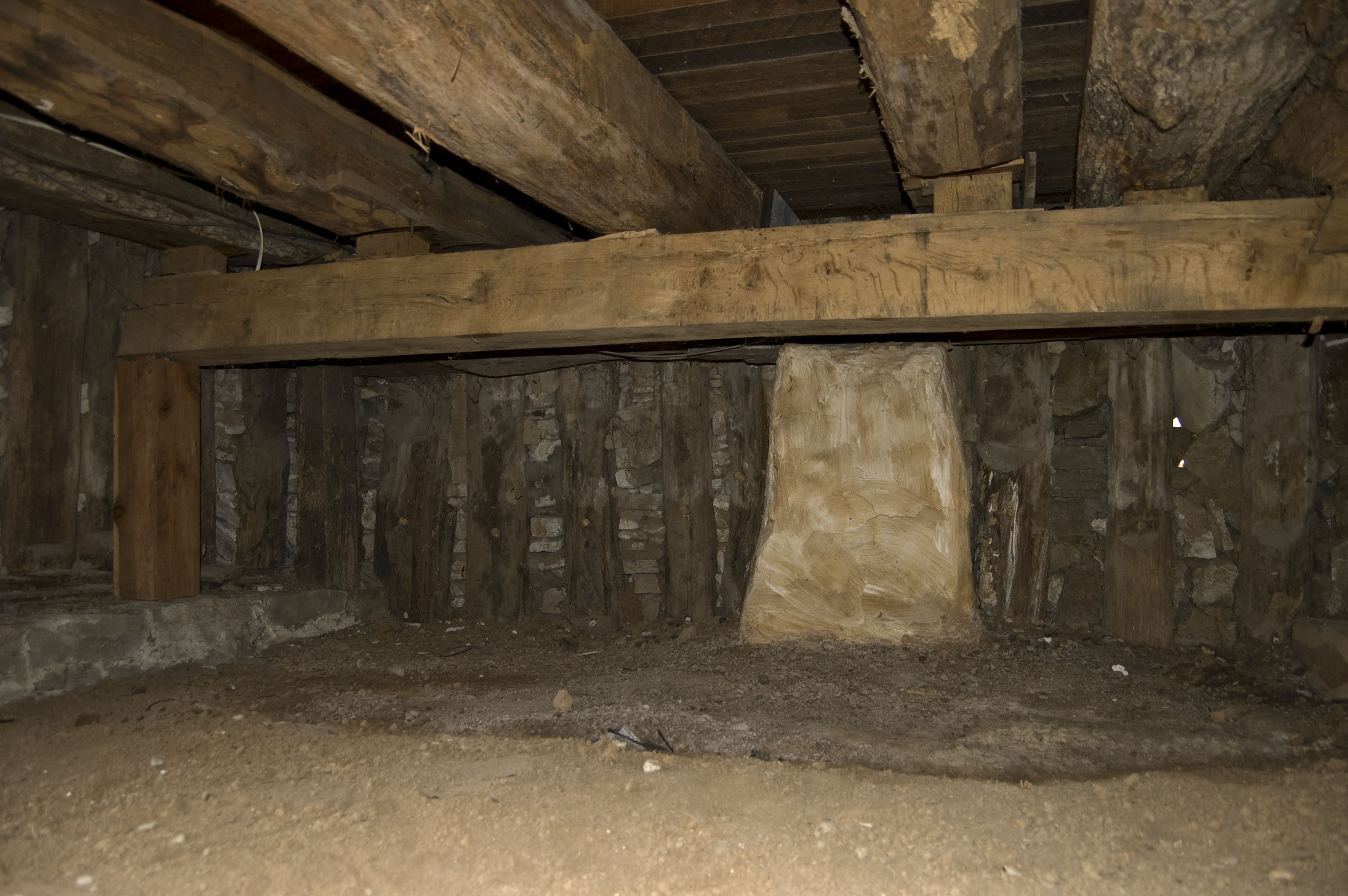
Poteaux-en-Terre-Cellar of the Maison Beauvais-Amoureux.

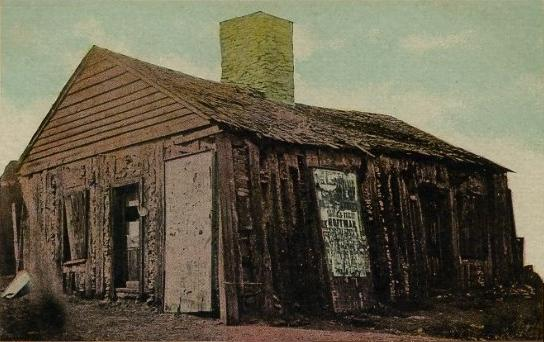
First Courthouse, St. Louis, Missouri; from a c. 1915 postcard.

== See also ==
- French colonization of the Americas
- Old Spanish Fort (Pascagoula, Mississippi). The La Pointe-Krebs House.
- Pit-house
- Post church
- Ste. Genevieve, Missouri
- Stilt house
