= Espanola =

Espanola or Española are a Spanish, Asturian, and Galician feminine adjective meaning "Spanish". It may also refer to:

- Espanola, Florida, United States
- Espanola, Washington, United States
- Española Island, one of the Galápagos Islands
- Española, New Mexico, United States
- Espanola, Ontario, Canada
- Hispaniola, an island known in Spanish as La Española
- Sofronio Española, Palawan, a municipality in the Philippines
- Espanola (brigade) a Russian irregular military formation

== See also ==
- Spanish (disambiguation)
- Spain (disambiguation)
- España (disambiguation)
- Español (disambiguation)
