= Nathaniel Grubing =

- Born: Jamaica
- Occupation: Pirate
- Years active: 1692-1697
- Employer: The French
- Known for: Leading several raids on Jamaica before his capture

Nathaniel Grubing (Note: Last name usually Grubing, occasionally Grubbing or Grubbin, first name usually Nathaniel but sometimes recorded as William.) (fl. 1692–1697) was an English pirate who sailed in service to the French. He is best known for leading several raids on Jamaica before his capture.

== History ==
Grubing was English and Jamaica-born but sailed for the French after the outbreak of King William's War, as did many other English sailors – Jacobites and Catholics, debtors, and privateers dissatisfied with England's discouragement of privateering. Jamaica's Governor Beeston wrote, “Among the chief of these rogues was one Grubbin, who was born here of English parents, and who knowing every part of the Island had done much mischief by landing in the night, robbing lone settlements, and going away again before notice could be given to any force to oppose him.”

In early 1692 Grubing raided Spanish River in Jamaica. Local authorities commissioned two armed sloops to chase Grubing and other French privateers and offered a reward for his capture. They soon commissioned a third sloop to sail after him and strengthened the island's fortifications. The sloops were unsuccessful and that September they ordered a fourth captain to command the efforts against Grubing, though insubordinate officers hampered his efforts.

On Hispaniola in the summer of 1694 a Jamaican sloop took aboard Grubing's wife, who complained that he “used her very ill.” On his next raid Grubing warned the Jamaicans to return her or “he would carry off every woman he met with till he had his wife again.” He made good on his threat, kidnapping a Major's wife and the 14-year-old daughter of a minister's widow. Beeston sent representatives to French Governor Du Casse to complain but the French ignored their flag of truce and captured Beeston's men as well.

Finally in January 1697 an Englishman named Captain Moses apprehended several Frenchmen, Grubing among them. Beeston rewarded him handsomely. Du Casse demanded Grubing's return and threatened a captured English Captain named Price in return. Beeston was not swayed: “that shall not hinder me from causing Grubbin to suffer whatever the law may condemn him in, nor do I think that Mons. Ducasse will venture to do anything to an innocent man for the punishment of a criminal.”

== See also ==
- John Bear - another English pirate who switched sides, first aiding the Spanish, later the French.
