= Spanish River (Jamaica) =

Coordinates: 18°14′N 76°37′W

Location
- Country: Jamaica

Physical characteristics
- Length: 12.5 km (7.8 mi)

The Spanish River is a river of Jamaica. It flows from south to north, the height of its delta is 0-40m. The Spring Garden, near the Spanish River, was one of the earliest sugar plantations in Jamaica. This river tends to be in very shady regions.

In 1692, pirate Nathaniel Grubing (an Englishman sailing for the French) sailed up Spanish River, raiding homes and plantations ashore. Jamaican officials sent several ships after Grubing but he had been born on Jamaica and knew the area well, and managed to escape.

== Sources ==
- GEOnet Names Server
- OMC Map
- CIA Map
- Ford, Jos C. and Finlay, A.A.C. (1908).The Handbook of Jamaica. Jamaica Government Printing Office
