= España Lake =

Lake in Santa Cruz Department, Bolivia

- Location within Bolivia Location within South America
- Interactive map of España Lake
- Location: Santa Cruz Department
- Coordinates: 16°1′8″S 63°59′41″W
- Basin countries: Bolivia
- Surface area: 34 km^{2} (13 sq mi)

España Lake is a lake in the Santa Cruz Department, Bolivia. Its surface area is 34 km^{2}.

== See also ==
- Laguna Pailas
