= Robert J. Spane =

United States Navy vice admiral

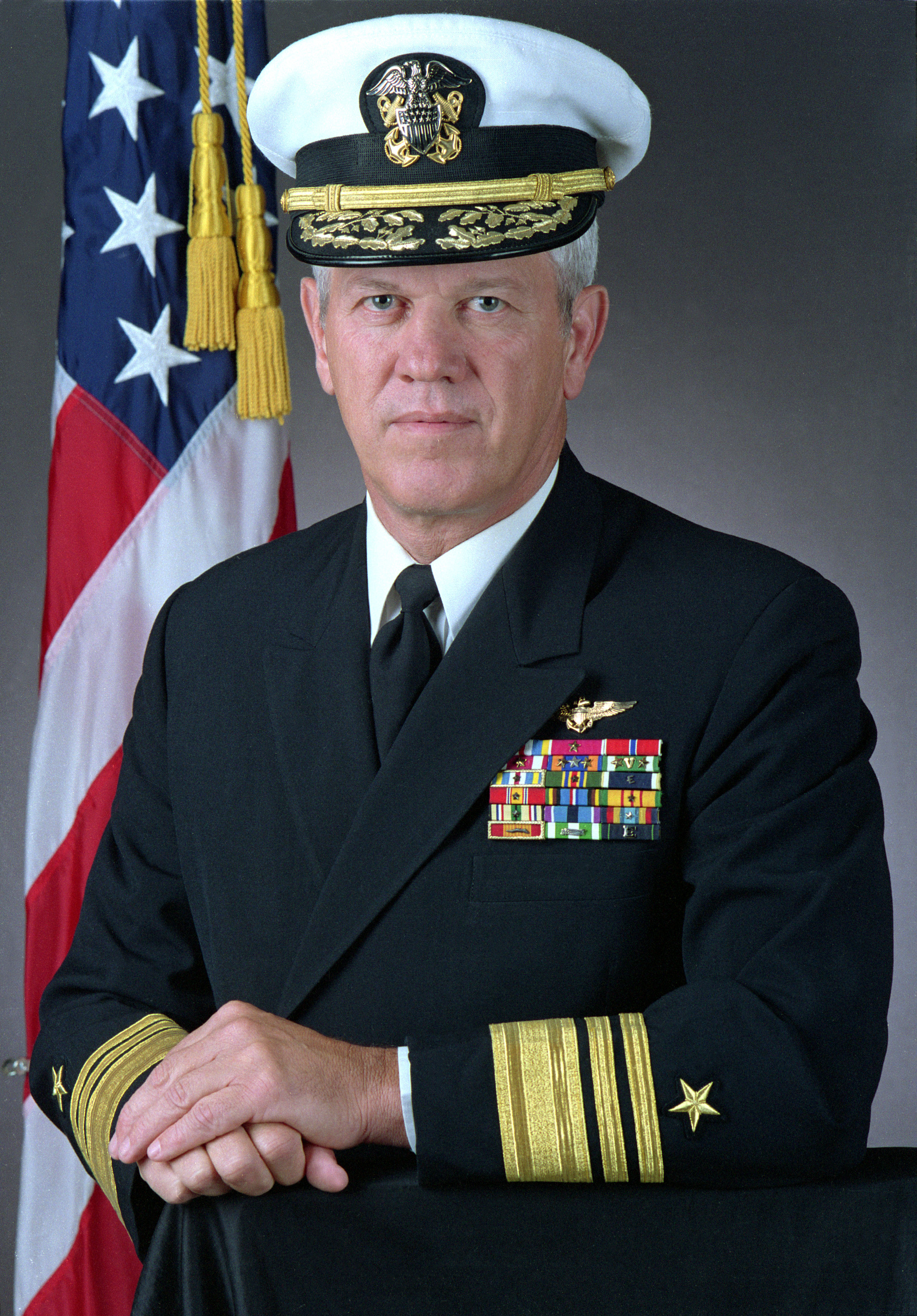
- Born: May 5, 1940 (age 86); Ely, Nevada, U.S.
- Military career
- Allegiance: United States
- Branch: United States Navy
- Service years: 1962–1996
- Rank: Vice admiral

Robert Johnson (Rocky) Spane (born May 5, 1940) was a vice admiral in the United States Navy. He was Commander, Naval Air Force Pacific from 1993 to 1996. Spane is a 1962 U.S. Naval Academy graduate.
