= Hispanic (disambiguation) =

Hispanic is a term for the people and culture of Spain and other Spanish-speaking countries.

Hispanic may also refer to:

- Hispanic America
- Hispanic and Latino Americans
- Hispanic (magazine)
- Spanish people
- The quality of Hispanidad
- Hispanophone or Spanish-speaking countries
- People or things originating in the Roman province of Hispania

== See also ==
- Hispanic culture in The Philippines
- Hispano (disambiguation)
- Spanish language in the United States
