= Spain (Between the Trees album) =

Studio album by Between the Trees
- Released: August 11, 2009
- Recorded: 2009
- Genre: Indie rock
- Length: 37:41
- Label: Bonded

Between the Trees chronology
The Story and the Song (2006)	Spain (2009)	Winter EP (2009)

Singles from Spain
- 1. "We Can Try" Released: June 30, 2009

Professional ratings
Review scores
Source	Rating
AllMusic	4/5 stars
Jesus Freak Hideout	3.5/5 stars

Spain is the second and final full-length studio album by American rock band Between the Trees, released through Bonded Records on August 11, 2009.

The album opens with the first single "We Can Try", which was released on June 30, 2009. The song also had a music video created and released along with the single. The album also contains "One Last Time (Darlin' II)", which is the sequel song to the song from their debut album, "Darlin'".

== Track listing ==
1. "We Can Try" – 4:03
2. "Spain" – 3:55
3. "The One Thing" – 3:41
4. "One Last Time (Darlin' II)" – 3:21
5. "Story of a Boy" – 4:21
6. "Miss You" – 3:32
7. "Move" – 3:09
8. "Scarecrow" – 3:58
9. "Gentleman" – 3:03
10. "Changed by You" – 4:41
