= Rhapsodie espagnole =

Rhapsodie espagnole may refer to:

- Rapsodie espagnole, an orchestral rhapsody by Maurice Ravel
- Rhapsodie espagnole (Liszt), a composition for solo piano by Franz Liszt
- Rapsodia española, a musical composition by Isaac Albéniz
- España (Chabrier), a rhapsody for orchestra by Emmanuel Chabrier

== See also ==
- Spanish Rhapsody, a 1991 album by Kenny Wheeler
