= Pierrotage =

Timber framing technique

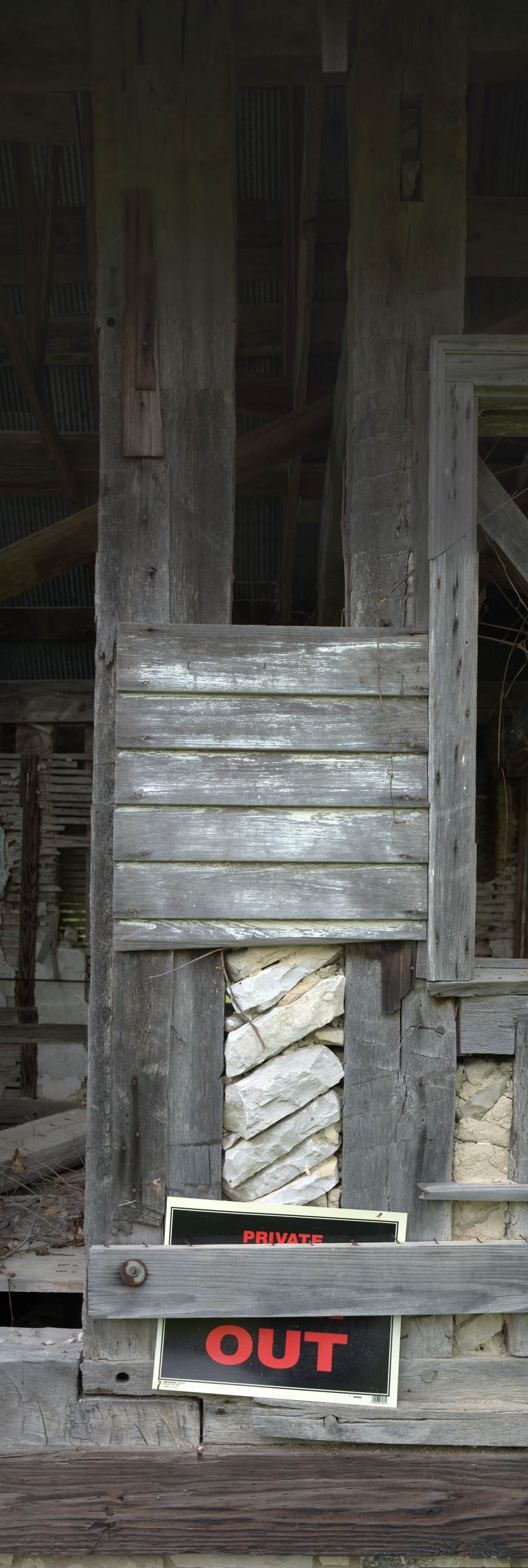
An example of pierrotage in the Durand Cabin which is poteaux-sur-solle style framing. The framing is covered by clapboards nailed directly to the studs and posts without sheathing. On the back and left interior walls are sawn lath with lime plaster.

Pierrotage is a half-timbered timber framing technique in which stone infill is used between posts. It was used in France and by French settlers in French Canada and Upper Louisiana.

== See also ==
- Bousillage
- French architecture
- French colonization of the Americas
- New France
- Poteaux-en-terre
- Poteaux-sur-solle
- Ste. Genevieve, Missouri
- Vernacular architecture
