= Spain (disambiguation) =

Spain is a sovereign state in southwestern Europe.

Spain may also refer to:

== People ==
- Spain Rodriguez, cartoonist

== Places and politics ==
- The whole of the Iberian Peninsula was called Spain in the Middle Ages
- Spain (European Parliament constituency)
- Spain, South Dakota, an unincorporated community in the United States

== Music ==
- Spain (band), a 1990s American jazz-rock band
- Spain (Between the Trees album), 2009
- Spain (Michel Camilo and Tomatito album), 2000
- "Spain" (instrumental), a 1971 instrumental jazz fusion composition by Chick Corea
- "Spain" (John Paul Young song), 1986
- "Spain", a song by Blonde Redhead from their 2010 album Penny Sparkle

== Other uses ==
- Spain (horse), an American Thoroughbred racehorse
- Spain (poem), by W. H. Auden
- Spain, the national personification in the webmanga series Hetalia: Axis Powers

== See also ==
- Spane (disambiguation)
- España (disambiguation)
- Spanish (disambiguation)
