= Old Spanish Fort (Pascagoula, Mississippi) =

Historic house in Mississippi, United States

- La Pointe-Krebs House
- U.S. National Register of Historic Places
- Mississippi Landmark
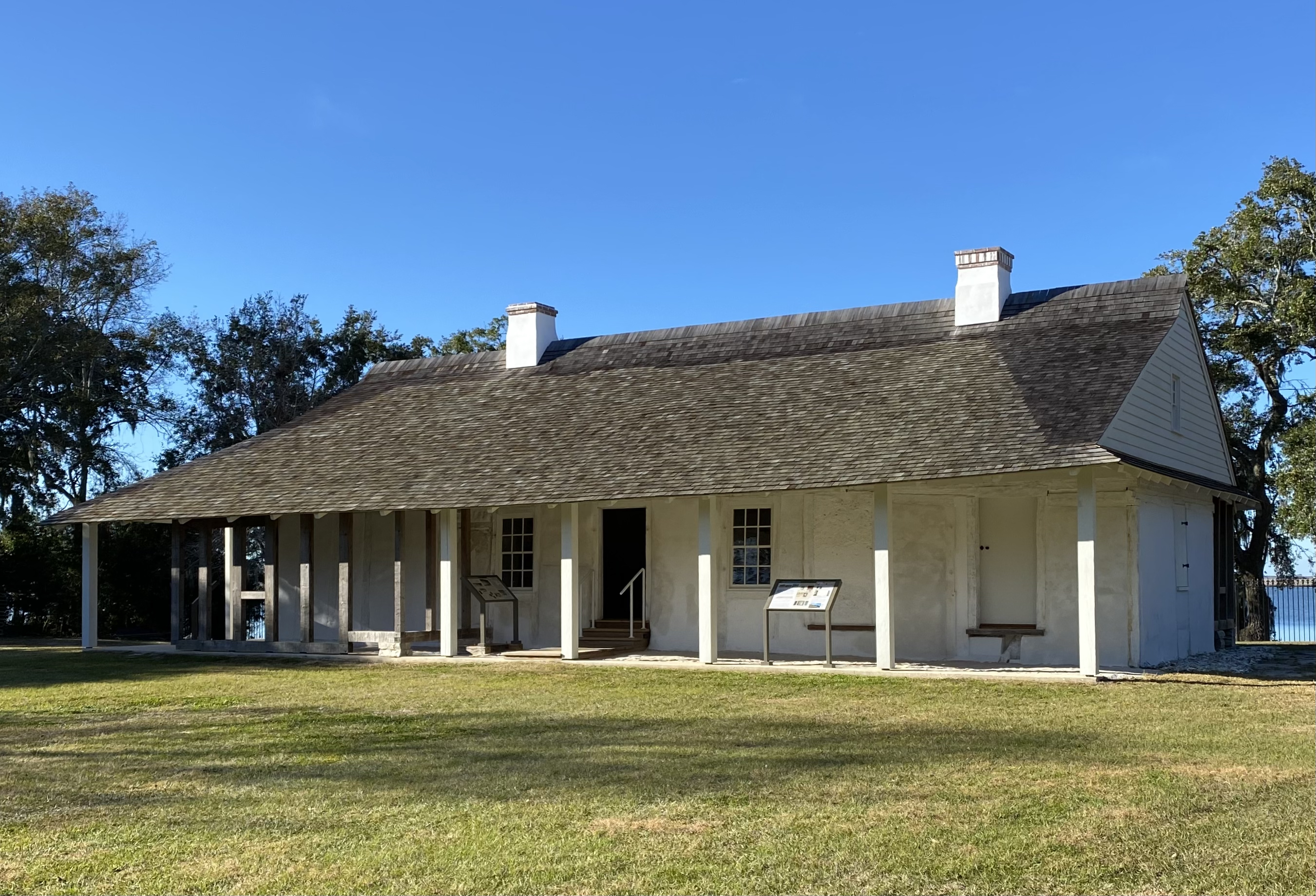
- Main facade in 2022

- Location within Mississippi Location within the United States
- Location: 200 Fort Street; Pascagoula, Mississippi
- Coordinates: 30°22′49″N 88°33′29″W
- Built: circa 1757
- Architectural style: French Colonial
- NRHP reference No.: 71000452
- USMS No.: 059-PAS-0001-NR-ML

Significant dates
- Added to NRHP: 1971
- Designated USMS: January 5, 1984

The LaPointe-Krebs House, also known as the "Old Spanish Fort" and "Old French Fort," was built on the shore of Lake Catahoula (Krebs Lake) near what is now Pascagoula, Mississippi, on land granted to the French Canadian Joseph Simon dit La Pointe. Construction of the house is tentatively believed to have begun circa 1757 based on dendrochronology of structural timbers in the earliest portion of the structure, making it Mississippi's oldest extant historic building and the only French colonial-era structure in the state. It is the oldest scientifically confirmed standing structure on the Gulf Coast of the United States, although the Old Ursuline Convent in New Orleans is known to have been designed by Ignace François Broutin in 1745 and completed by 1753. The LaPointe-Krebs House was added to the National Register of Historic Places in 1971 and was designated a Mississippi Landmark in 1984. The LaPointe-Krebs House is owned and operated by the LaPointe-Krebs Foundation as a museum.

== Description ==
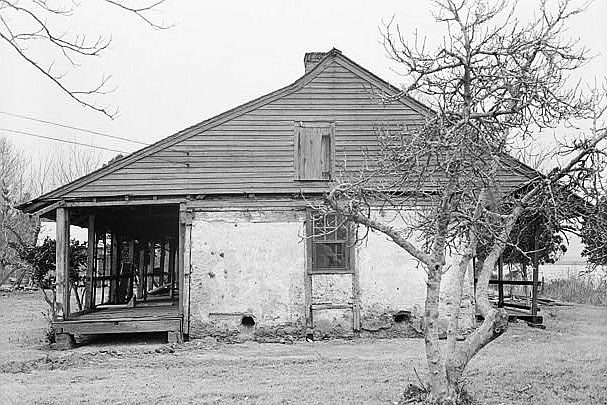
Exterior walls were constructed with oyster-shell concrete

The "Old Spanish Fort" was not really a fort. Instead, it was a one-story, three-room structure that measured 37 feet (11 meters) in width and 62.25 feet (18.97 meters) in length. Framing walls were 18 inches (46 centimeters) thick. The building is constructed of longleaf pine framing, with walls of oyster-shell concrete in the oldest construction and with bousillage of clay and Spanish moss in the western and most recent addition. Dendrochronology has been used to date timbers from the center tabby room to 1757; samples from the east tabby addition date to 1762 and 1772. It is entirely possible that wood from an earlier structure or structures was recycled, possibly as late as the 1770s and in the wake of a hurricane that struck in 1772. While no samples could be determined in the western bousillage addition, construction techniques and tool marks date this addition to 1820.

Three sides of the structure were bounded by porches, supported by square wooden posts that were joined by a timber framing system. The gable roof was covered with wooden shingles. Two fireplace chimneys were composed of stucco-covered brick. The original structure had one large room with two smaller rooms. Flooring was oyster-shell concrete covered in 1820 with boards at a height of 18 inches (46 centimeters).

== History ==
Between 1713 and 1717, Joseph Simon dit La Pointe, a native of Montreal, was granted land at the mouth of the Pascagoula River. He was one of several Canadians to come to Pascagoula from the area around Mobile Bay; two neighboring plantations were owned by Canadian families that had relocated from Dauphin Island. The land was first used to breed cattle. This commercial activity was followed by a plantation model focused on indigo and wax myrtle, with the former used to produce blue dye and the latter for candlemaking. La Pointe quickly became invested in the emerging institution of chattel slavery, enslaving Native Americans before purchasing African slaves.

La Pointe died in 1751, thereby allowing his daughter Marie-Josèphe and German son-in-law Hugo Ernestus Krebs to come into possession of the property. The property was maintained as a plantation during their ownership, and enslaved African labor was used to produce commodities such as rice and cotton. According to Anglo-Dutch traveler Bernard Romans, Krebs also created a roller cotton gin more than two decades before the invention of Eli Whitney's in 1793

The name Old Spanish Fort was derived during Spanish control of the Mississippi Territory in the late eighteenth century, when the structure served as a fortified home of Don Enrique Ginarest, an officer in the Spanish Army, who married the granddaughter of Hugo Krebs.

The structure was owned and occupied by descendants of Hugo Krebs until 1914. At present day, the LaPointe-Krebs House serve as a museum for the history of Pascagoula and Jackson County.

== Gallery ==
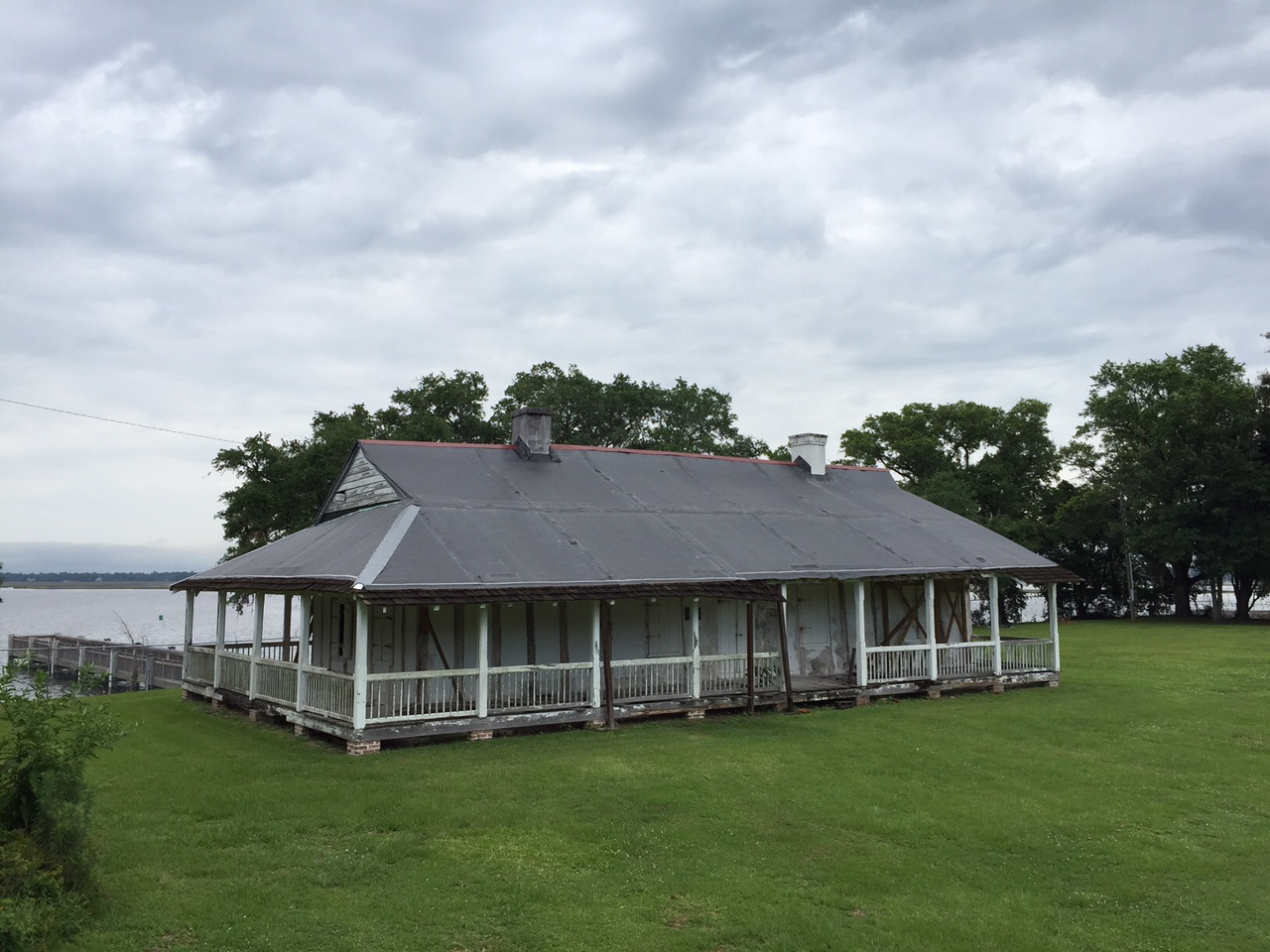
South-facing facade in 2015, before restoration

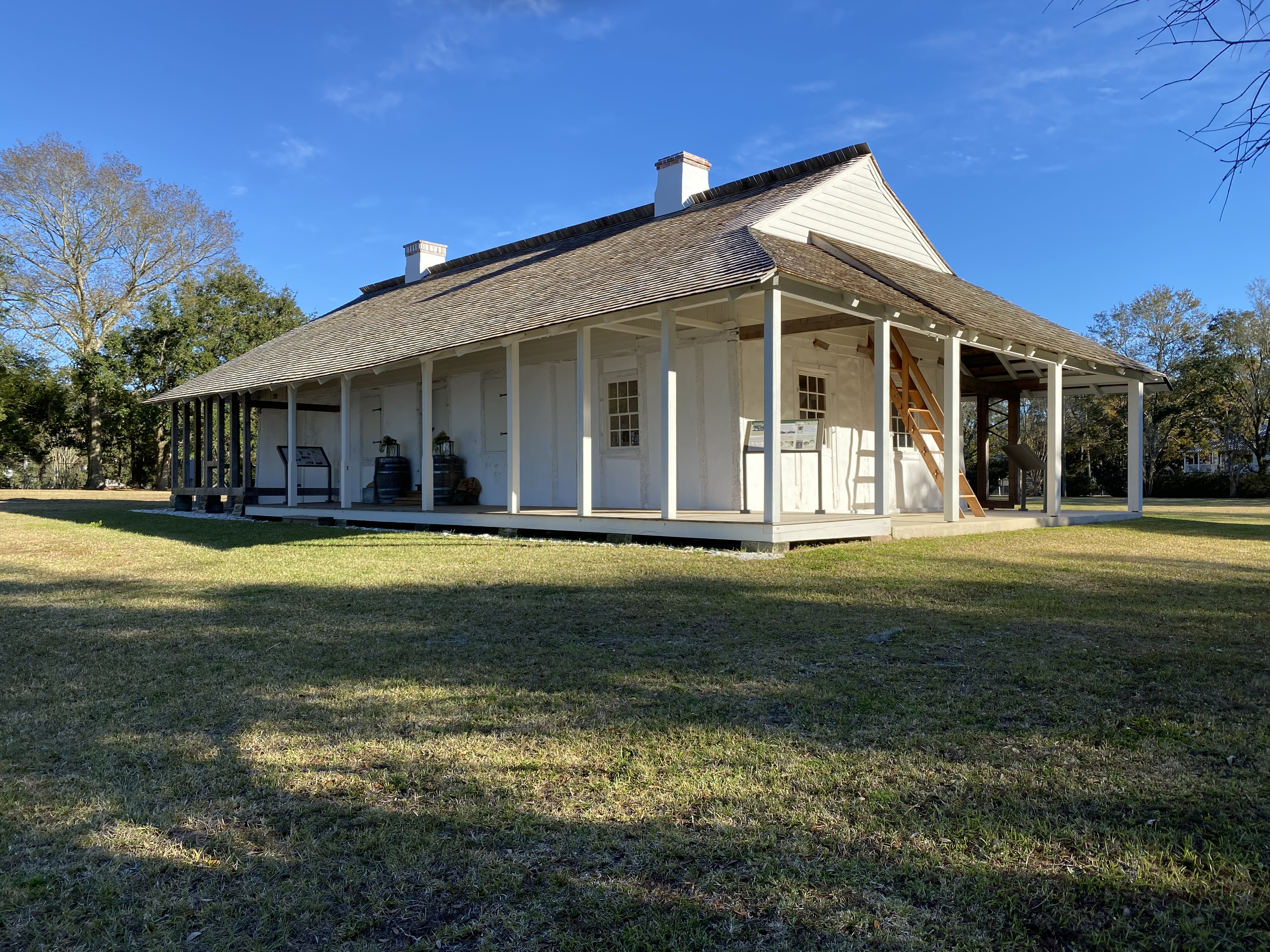
Northwest view of LaPointe Krebs House in January 2022, after restoration

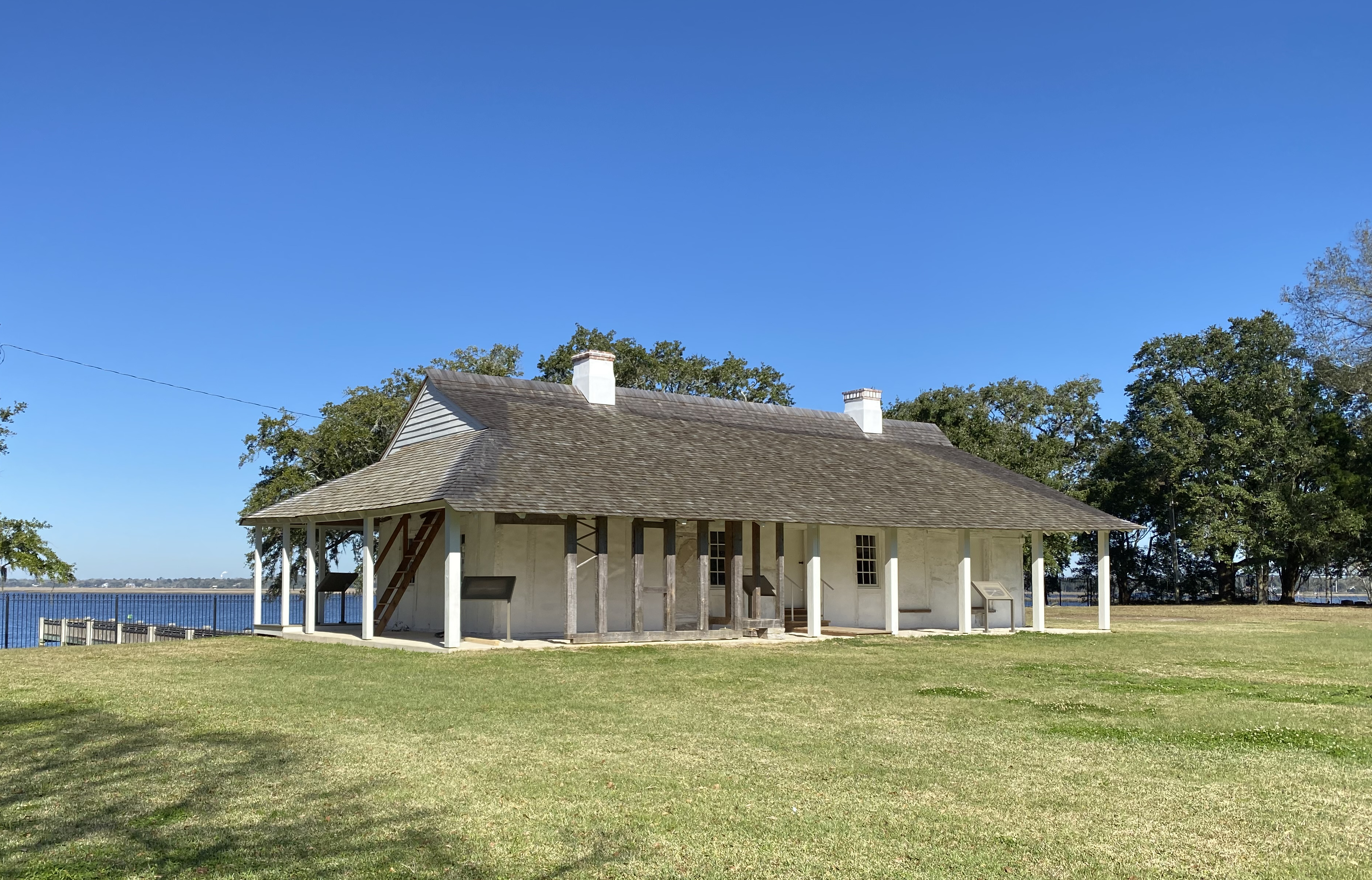
Southwest view of LaPointe Krebs House in January 2022, after restoration
