= Kragerø (disambiguation) =

Kragerø is a municipality in Telemark county, Norway.

Kragerø or Kragero may also refer to:

== Places ==
- Kragero Township, Chippewa County, Minnesota, a township in the state of Minnesota in the United States
- Kragerø (town), a town in Kragerø municipality in Telemark county, Norway
- Kragerø (island), an island in Kragerø municipality in Telemark county, Norway
- Kragerø Church, a church in Kragerø municipality in Telemark county, Norway
- Kragerø Station, a railway station in Kragerø municipality in Telemark county, Norway

== Transportation ==
- Kragerø Fjordbåtselskap, a ferry company operating in Telemark county, Norway
- Kragerø Line, a defunct railway line in Telemark, Norway
