= Sannidal =

Sannidal may refer to:

== Places ==
- Sannidal Municipality, a former municipality in Telemark county, Norway
- Sannidal, or Kil, Telemark, a village in Kragerø Municipality in Telemark county, Norway
- Sannidal prestegjeld, a former geographic subdivision of the Church of Norway in Telemark county, Norway
- Sannidal Station, a railway station in Kragerø Municipality in Telemark county, Norway

== Other ==
- Sannidal IL, a sports club based in Kragerø Municipality in Telemark county, Norway
