= Therkelsen =

Therkelsen is a surname. Notable people with the surname include:

- Jimmi Therkelsen (born 1991), Danish BMX rider
- Charlotte Therkelsen (born 1981), Norwegian politician
- Jonas Therkelsen (born 2003), Norwegian footballer
