= Fossingfjorden =

Fjord in Norway

- Fossingfjord (unofficial)
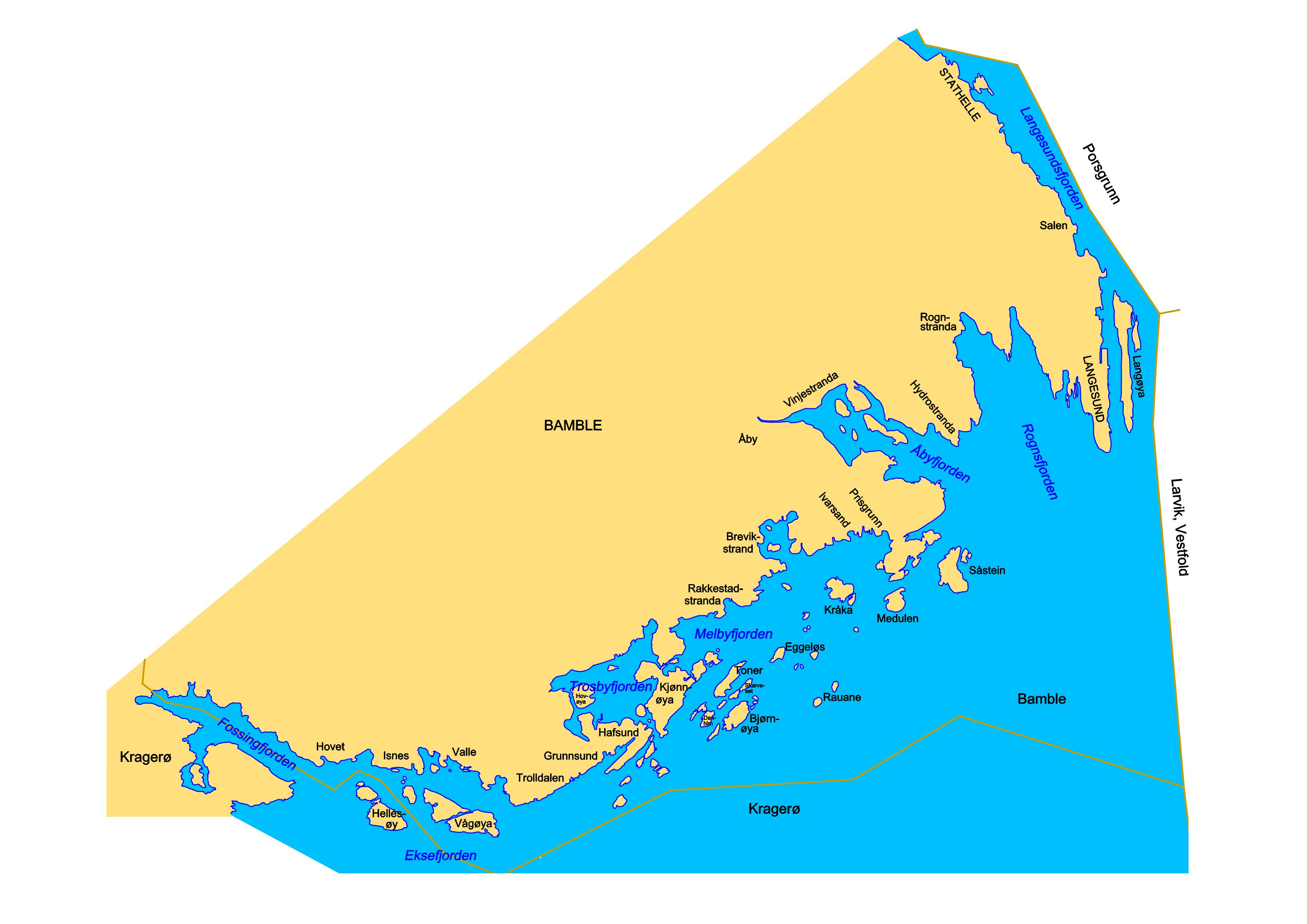
- Map of the Fossingfjorden area
- Interactive map of the fjord
- Location: Telemark county, Norway
- Coordinates: 58.93382°N 9.48936°E
- Type: Fjord
- Basin countries: Norway
- Max. length: 4 kilometres (2.5 mi)

Fossingfjorden is a fjord in Telemark county, Norway. The 4-kilometre (2.5 mi) long fjord forms part of the border between Kragerø Municipality and Bamble Municipality. The entrance to the fjord lies about 1.2 kilometres (0.75 mi) north of the island of Langøy. The small islands of Store Furuholmen and Hellesøy lie just outside the mouth of the fjord.

== See also ==
- List of Norwegian fjords
