= Jone Blikra =

Norwegian politician

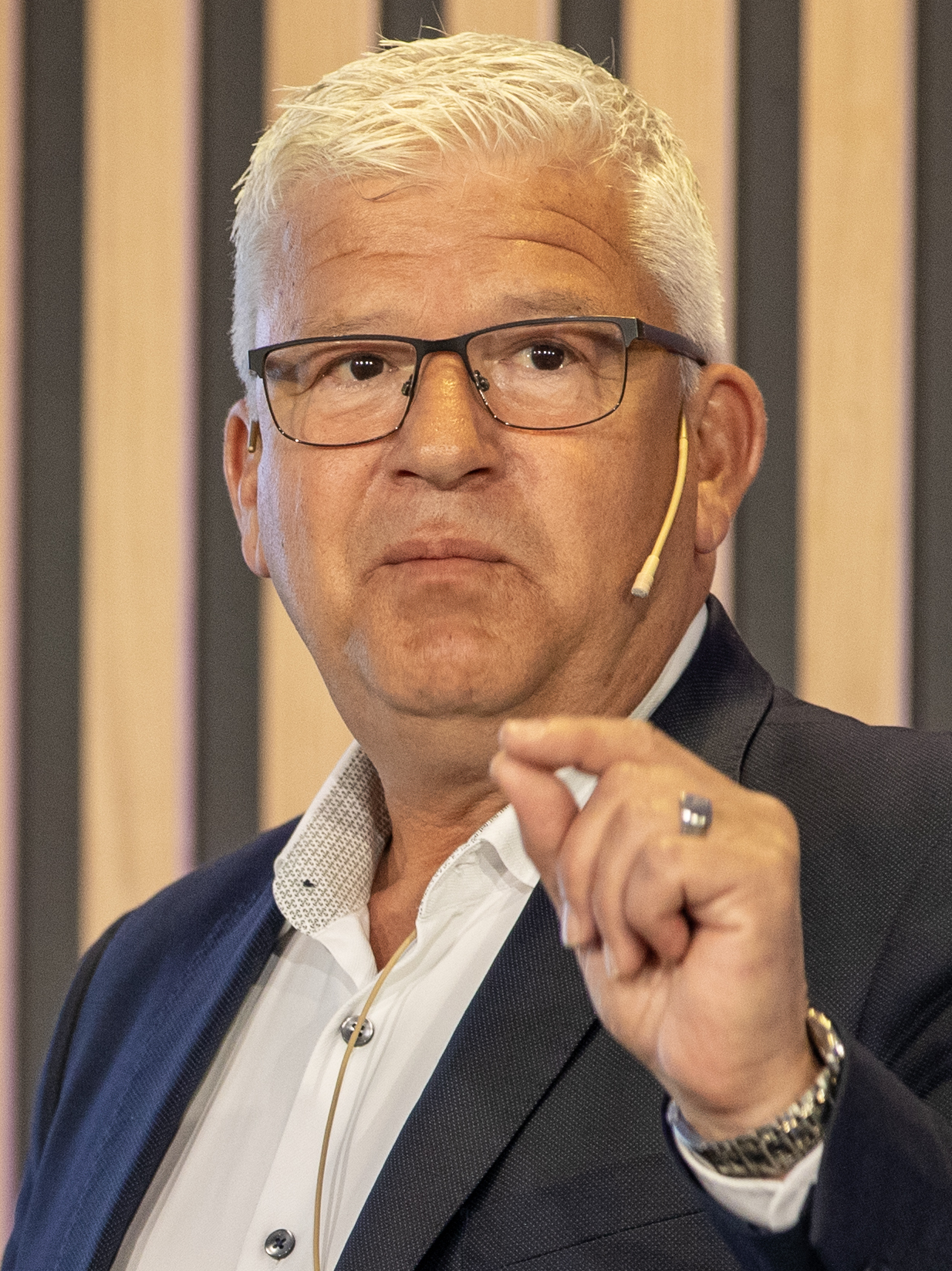

Deputy Member of the Storting
- Incumbent
- Assumed office 1 October 2021
- Deputising for: Terje Aasland (2022–)
- Constituency: Telemark

Mayor of Kragerø Municipality
- In office 22 October 2015 – 17 October 2019
- Deputy: Charlotte Therkelsen
- Preceded by: Kåre Preben Hegland
- Succeeded by: Grunde Knudsen

Personal details
- Born: 11 October 1962 (age 63)
- Party: Labour Party
- Occupation: Police officer Politician

Jone Blikra (born 11 October 1962) is a Norwegian police officer and politician for the Labour Party. A deputy to the Storting from Telemark from 2021, he has met as deputy for Terje Aasland since 2022.

== Personal life ==
Blikra was born on 11 October 1962, a son of Kristoffer Blikra and Margit Lillemo and hails from Kragerø Municipality.

== Political career ==
=== Local politics ===
Blikra was a member of the municipal council of Kragerø Municipality from 1999, and served as mayor of Kragerø from 2015 to 2019. He took over from Kåre Preben Hegland from the Conservative Party. Following the 2019 local elections, he was succeeded by Grunde Knudsen from the Centre Party.

=== Parliament ===
He was elected deputy representative to the Storting from the constituency of Telemark at the 2021 election. He was re-elected in 2025. He has deputised for Terje Aasland since March 2022 while Aasland was government minister. In the Storting, Blikra was a member of the Standing Committee on Transport and Communications from 2022.

== Civic career ==
Blikra is police officer by education and worked in the police from 1985 to 2019. From 1992 to 1993 he served as police for the United Nations Protection Force.

He chaired the Telemark chapter of the Norwegian Police Federation from 1999 to 2006. From 2012 to 2014 he held the position of lensmann (leader of a rural police district) in Drangedal Municipality.

Blikra previously chaired the board of Teater Ibsen, a theatre based in Skien.
