= Portør =

Village in Kragerø Municipality, Norway

- Village
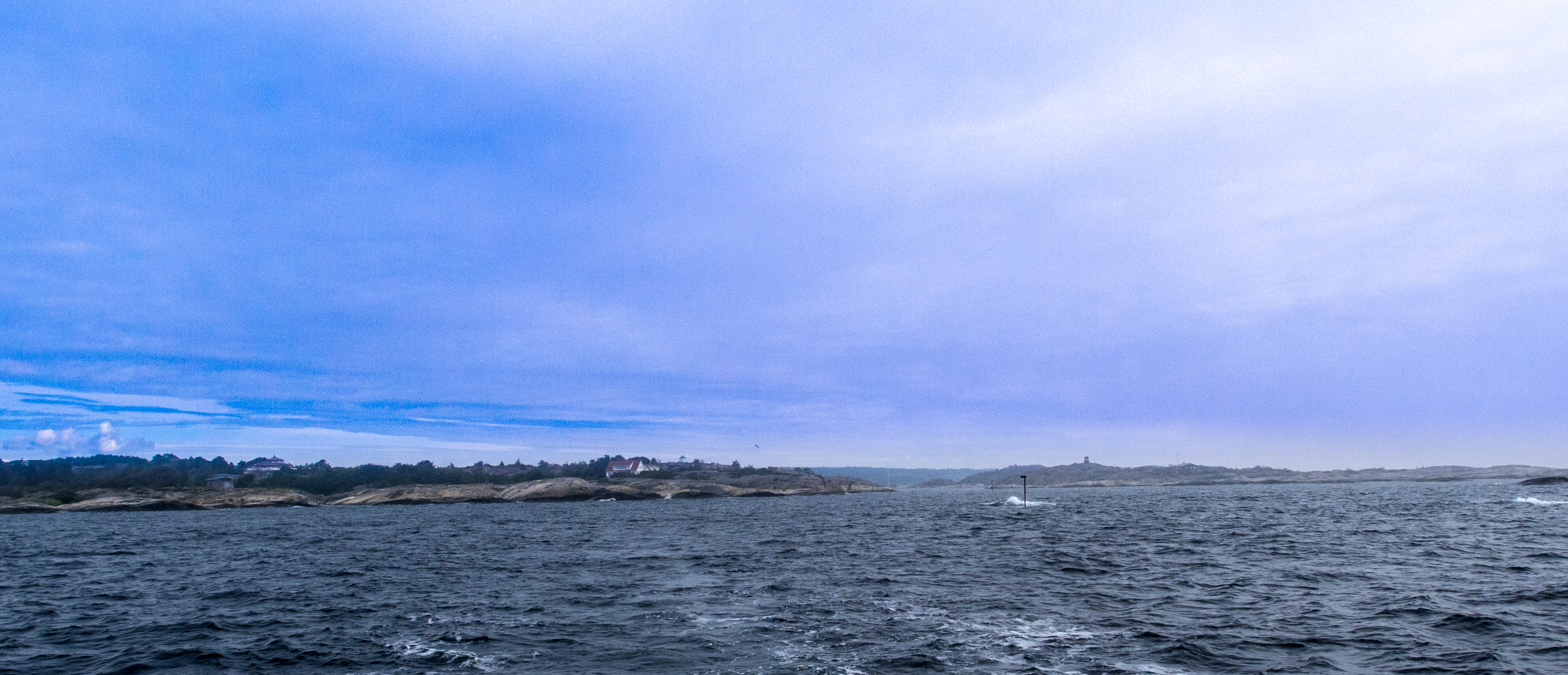
- View of the village seen from the ocean
- Interactive map of Portør
- Coordinates: 58.8057°N 9.43288°E
- Country: Norway
- Region: Eastern Norway
- County: Telemark
- District: Vestmar
- Municipality: Kragerø Municipality
- Elevation: 5 m (16 ft)
- Time zone: UTC+01:00 (CET)
  - Summer (DST): UTC+02:00 (CEST)
- Post Code: 3788 Stabbestad

Portør is a village in Kragerø Municipality in Telemark county, Norway. The village is located on the southern Skaggerak coast of the municipality, about 7 kilometres (4.3 mi) straight south of the town of Kragerø. The Jomfruland National Park lies just off shore from Portør.

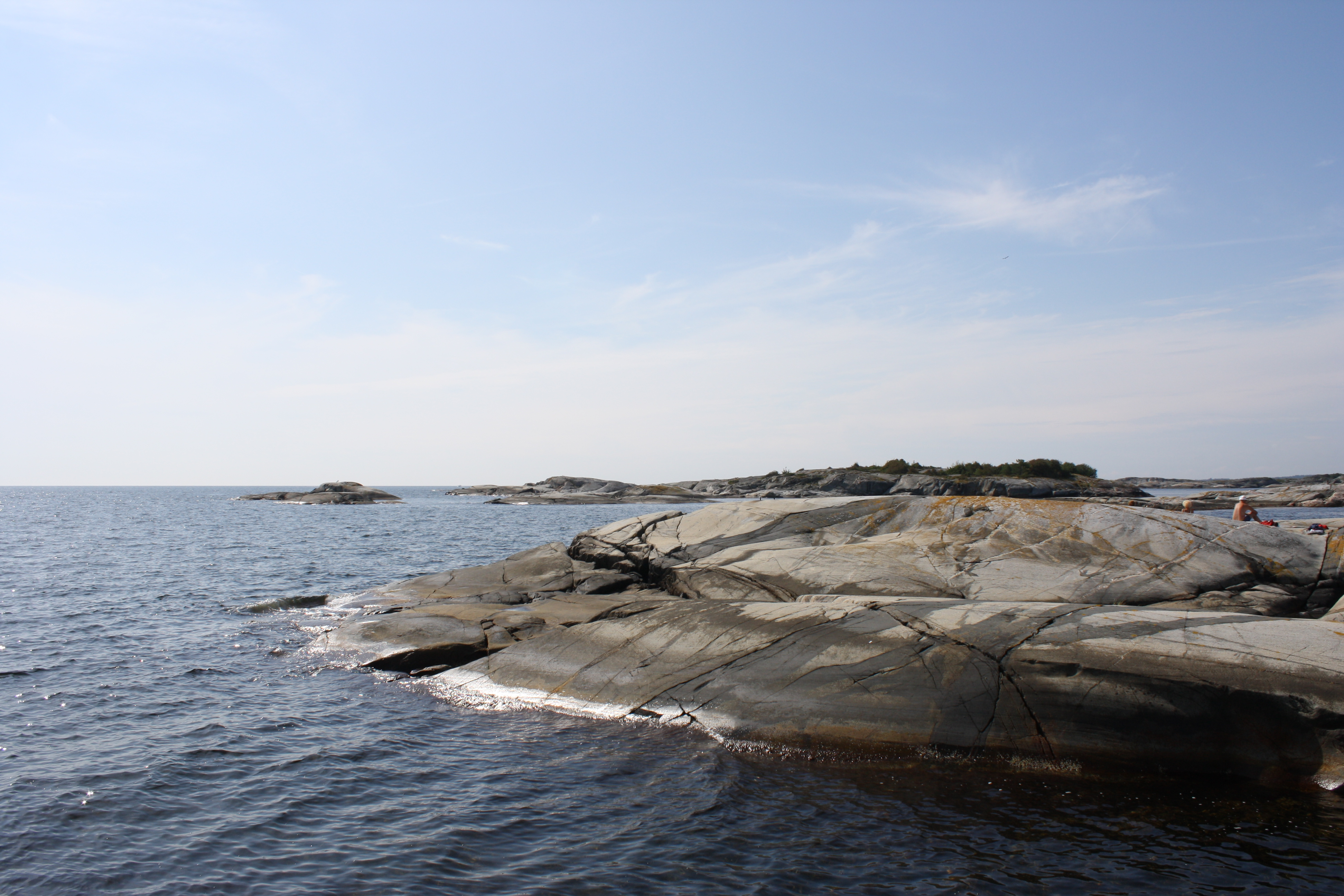
View of the sea just off shore of Portør

The Stølefjorden inlet extends inland just north of Portør. Norwegian county road 254 runs from Portør to the village of Levang where it meets Norwegian county road 351.

== History ==
In 1137, Portør was the base for Sigurd Slembe's Viking expeditions, until he himself was taken by surprise here and had to flee.

Until the mid-1960s, Portør harbor had a pilot station and customs station. Today, the village has a small harbor surrounded by old buildings.
