= Kragerø Fjordbåtselskap =

Norwegian transport company

Kragerø Fjordbåtselskap AS is a company that operates car- and passenger ferries in Kragerø Municipality, Norway. Three ferries are used to provide services from the mainland to Stabbestad, Tåtøy, Skåtøyroa, Bærø, Langøy, Gumøy and Jomfruland. At Stabbestad and Skåtøyroa the company also has corresponding bus routes.

The company dates back to 1896, and is owned by the city of Kragerø (58.57%), Telemark County Municipality (29.28%) and others (12.15%). It has three ferries, MF Jesper and MF Naus each with a capacity of 11 cars and 200 passengers as well as MF Kragerø with a capacity of 24 cars and 250 passengers. It also operates three buses and one water taxi. Scheduled services are operated on contract with Vestviken Kollektivtrafikk.
