= Langøy, Telemark =

Island in Telemark, Norway

Langøy
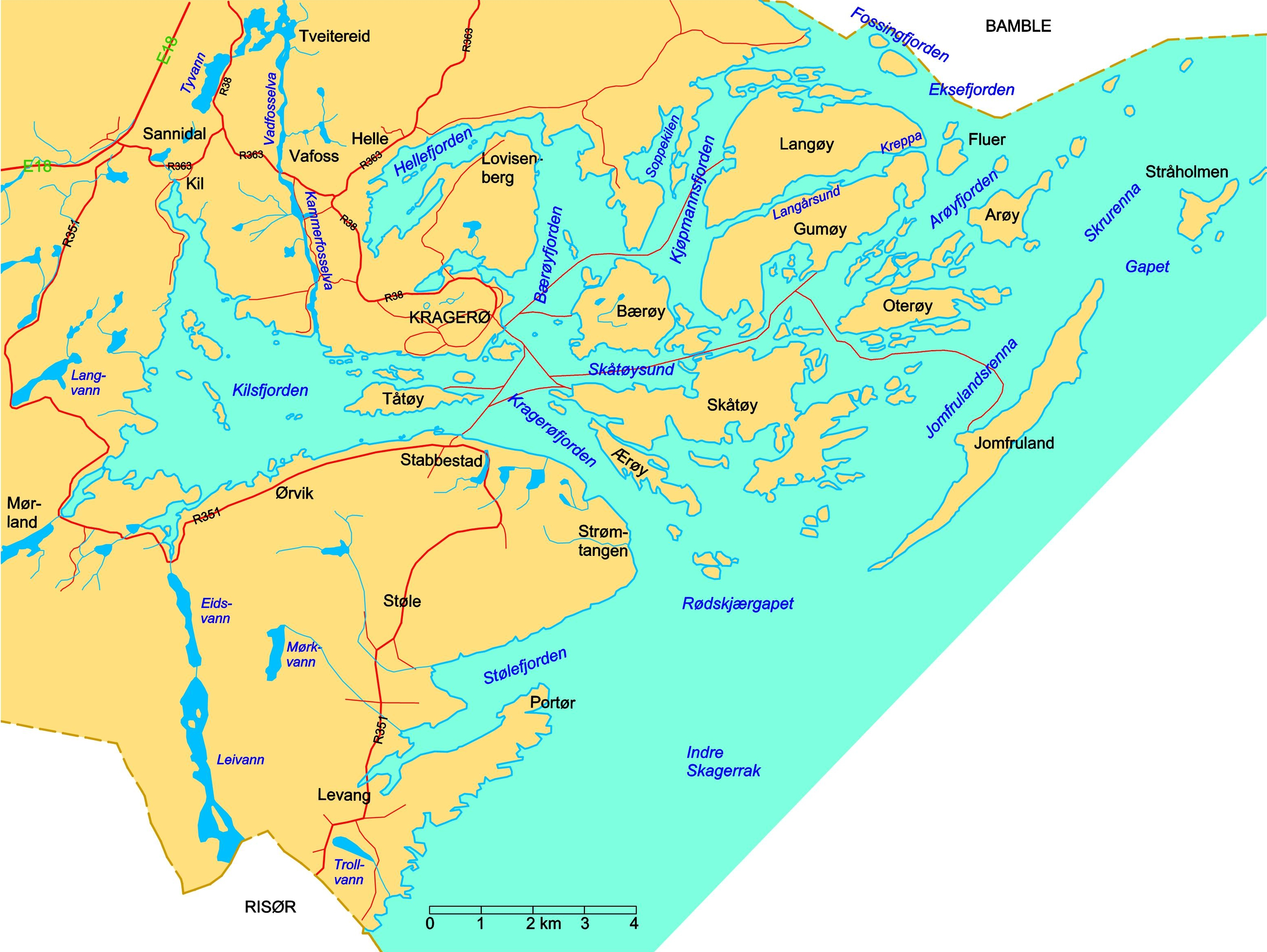
- Map of the Kragerø islands
- Interactive map of the island

Geography
- Location: Telemark, Norway
- Coordinates: 58.91098°N 9.53816°E
- Archipelago: Kragerø
- Area: 6.6 km^{2} (2.5 sq mi)
- Length: 4.5 km (2.8 mi)
- Width: 2 km (1.2 mi)
- Highest elevation: 121 m (397 ft)
- Highest point: Langøybratten

Administration
- Norway
- County: Telemark
- Municipality: Kragerø Municipality

Langøy is an island in Kragerø Municipality in Telemark county, Norway. The 6.6-square-kilometre (2.5 sq mi) island is the second largest island in Kragerø after Skåtøy. Its name, which means "Long island", reflects its shape only to some extent. It is located just north of the island of Gumøy.

The island is populated, and there is a ferry, operated by Kragerø Fjordbåtselskap, connecting the island to the town of Kragerø. There are several old mines on the island that used to provide iron to the ironworks of Fritzøe Jernverk and Bærum Jernverk. The mining of iron began on Langøy at some point during the 17th century, and it continued until the middle of the 19th century. With the decline of ironworks in Norway in the 1860s, there was soon no market for iron, and the last of the mines at Langøy had to shut down in 1869.

The highest point on the island is the 121-metre (397 ft) tall Langøybratten, followed by the 118-metre (387 ft) tall Skarheia.

== See also ==
- List of islands of Norway
