= Sannidal Municipality =

Former municipality in Norway

Sannidal Municipality Sannidal herred
- Former municipality
- Sandøkedal herred (historic name); Sannikedal herred (historic name)
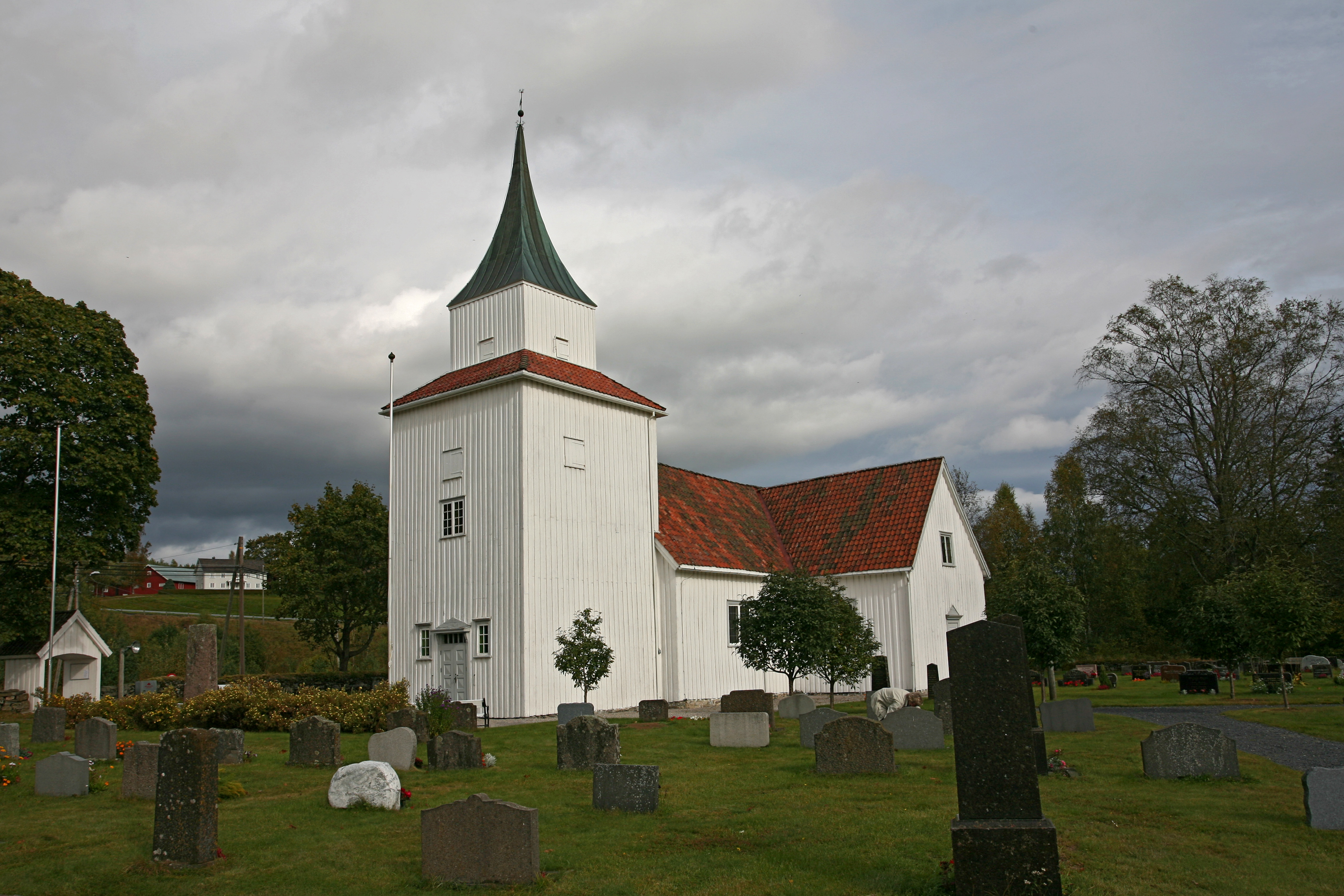
- View of Sannidal Church

- Telemark within Norway

- Sannidal within Telemark
- Coordinates: 58°53′45″N 9°17′06″E
- Country: Norway
- County: Telemark
- District: Vestmar
- Established: 1 Jan 1838
  - Created as: Formannskapsdistrikt
- Disestablished: 1 Jan 1964
  - Succeeded by: Kragerø Municipality
- Administrative centre: Kil

Government
  - Mayor (1955–1959): Per Holte (Ap)

Area (upon dissolution)
  - Total: 193.8 km^{2} (74.8 sq mi)
  - Rank: #384 in Norway
- Highest elevation (Store Valefjell): 329.16 m (1,079.9 ft)

Population (1959)
  - Total: 2,644
  - Rank: #352 in Norway
  - Density: 13.6/km^{2} (35/sq mi)
  - Change (10 years): ▲ +0.5%
- Demonym: Sannidøl

Official language
  - Norwegian form: Bokmål
- Time zone: UTC+01:00 (CET)
  - Summer (DST): UTC+02:00 (CEST)
- ISO 3166 code: NO-0816

Sannidal (Norwegian pronunciation: [ˈsɑnːidɑːl]; locally [ˈsɑnːidæ:l]) is a former municipality in Telemark county, Norway. The 193.8-square-kilometre (74.8 sq mi) municipality existed from 1838 until its dissolution in 1960. The area is now part of Kragerø Municipality. The administrative centre was the village of Kil where the Sannidal Church is located.

Prior to its dissolution in 1960, the 193.8-square-kilometre (74.8 sq mi) municipality was the 384th largest by area out of the 743 municipalities in Norway. Sannidal Municipality was the 352nd most populous municipality in Norway with a population of about 2,644. The municipality's population density was 13.6 inhabitants per square kilometre (35/sq mi) and its population had increased by 0.5% over the previous 10-year period.

== General information ==
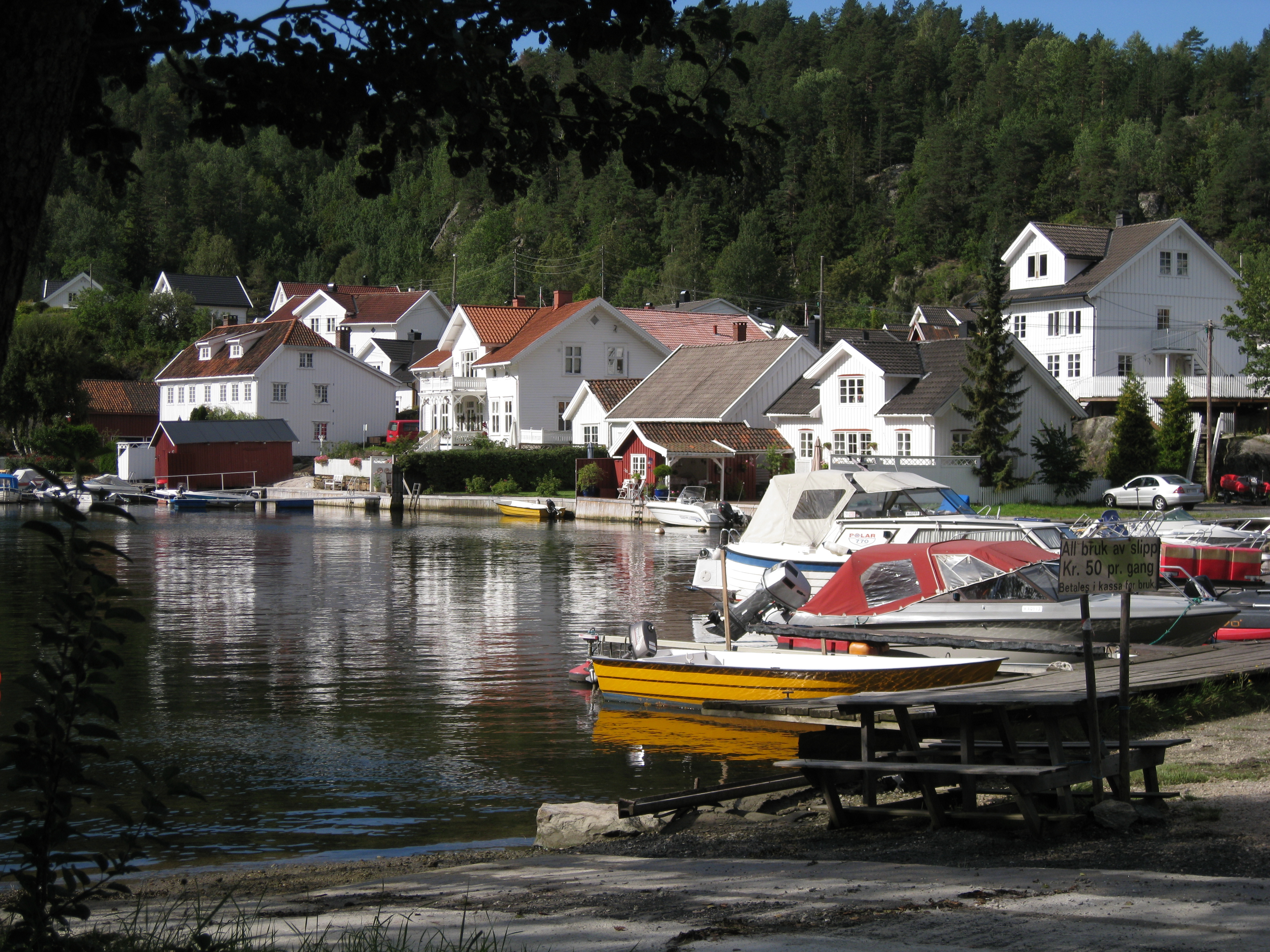
View of the village of Kil in Sannidal

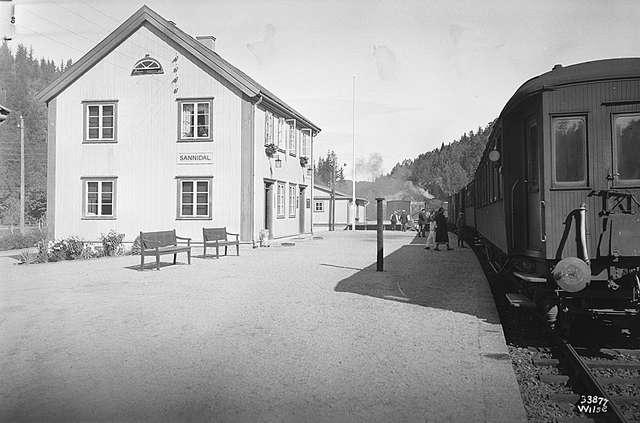
View of the old Sannidal railway station

=== Administrative history ===
The formannskapsdistrikt law of 1837 created a system of local government in Norway by establishing each town (ladested or kjøpstad) and each Church of Norway prestegjeld as a civil municipality. On 1 January 1838, Sannikedal prestegjeld was established as Sannikedal Municipality (later spelled Sandøkedal, then Sannidal).

On 1 January 1861, an area of Sandøkedal Municipality (population: 857) that was adjacent to the growing town of Kragerø was annexed and transferred from Sandøkedal Municipality to Kragerø Municipality. On 1 January 1882, Sandøkedal Municipality was divided as follows: the southeastern coastal and island district (population: 3,907) became the new Skaatø Municipality and the northwestern district (population: 2,186) continued as a smaller Sandøkedal Municipality.

During the 1960s, there were many municipal mergers across Norway due to the work of the Schei Committee. On 1 January 1960, Sannidal Municipality was dissolved and the following areas were merged to form an enlarged Kragerø Municipality:

- all of Sannidal Municipality (population: 2,604)
- all of Kragerø Municipality (population: 4,638)
- all of Skåtøy Municipality (population: 3,208)

=== Name ===
The municipality is named after the old Sannidal prestegjeld. The prestegjeld was named after the Sannidal valley (Old Norse: Sandaukadalr) since the first Sannidal Church was built there. The first element is the genitive case of the word sandauki which means "an increase of sand". This is likely referring to some sandbanks. The last element is dalr which means "valley" or "dale".

Historically, the name of the municipality was spelled Sannikedal. In 1857, the spelling was changed to Sandøkedal. In 1889, the name was changed back to Sannikedal. On 3 November 1917, a royal resolution changed the spelling of the name of the municipality to Sannidal.

=== Churches ===
The Church of Norway had one parish (sokn) within Sannidal Municipality. At the time of the municipal dissolution, it was part of the Sannidal prestegjeld and the Bamble prosti (deanery) in the Diocese of Agder.

Churches in Sannidal Municipality
Parish (sokn)	Church name	Location of the church	Year built
Sannidal	Sannidal Church	Kil	1772

== Geography ==
Sannidal Municipality was located just inland from the town of Kragerø. The main population centre of Sannidal was the village of Kil, which is situated at the end of the Kilsfjord. The highest point in the municipality was the 329.16-metre (1,079.9 ft) tall mountain Store Valefjell, located on the border with Drangedal Municipality.

Drangedal Municipality was located to the west and north, Bamble Municipality was located to the northeast, Skåtøy Municipality was located to the east, Søndeled Municipality (in Aust-Agder county) was located to the south, and Gjerstad Municipality (also in Aust-Agder county) was located to the southwest.

== Government ==
While it existed, Sannidal Municipality was responsible for primary education (through 10th grade), outpatient health services, senior citizen services, welfare and other social services, zoning, economic development, and municipal roads and utilities. The municipality was governed by a municipal council of directly elected representatives. The mayor was indirectly elected by a vote of the municipal council. The municipality was under the jurisdiction of the Kragerø District Court and the Agder Court of Appeal.

=== Municipal council ===
The municipal council (Herredsstyre) of Sannidal Municipality was made up of representatives that were elected to four year terms. The tables below show the historical composition of the council by political party.

Sannidal herredsstyre 1955–1959
Party name (in Norwegian)	Number of representatives
Labour Party (Arbeiderpartiet)	12
Christian Democratic Party (Kristelig Folkeparti)	3
Farmers' Party (Bondepartiet)	3
Liberal Party (Venstre)	3
Total number of members:	21
Note: On 1 January 1960, Sannidal Municipality became part of Kragerø Municipality.

Sannidal herredsstyre 1951–1955
Party name (in Norwegian)	Number of representatives
Labour Party (Arbeiderpartiet)	10
Christian Democratic Party (Kristelig Folkeparti)	4
Farmers' Party (Bondepartiet)	4
Liberal Party (Venstre)	2
Total number of members:	20

Sannidal herredsstyre 1947–1951
Party name (in Norwegian)	Number of representatives
Labour Party (Arbeiderpartiet)	10
Christian Democratic Party (Kristelig Folkeparti)	4
Liberal Party (Venstre)	2
Joint list of the Liberal Party (Venstre) and the Radical People's Party (Radikale Folkepartiet)	4
Total number of members:	20

Sannidal herredsstyre 1945–1947
Party name (in Norwegian)	Number of representatives
Labour Party (Arbeiderpartiet)	10
Christian Democratic Party (Kristelig Folkeparti)	5
Joint list of the Liberal Party (Venstre) and the Radical People's Party (Radikale Folkepartiet)	2
Local List(s) (Lokale lister)	3
Total number of members:	20

Sannidal herredsstyre 1937–1941*
Party name (in Norwegian)	Number of representatives
Labour Party (Arbeiderpartiet)	7
Liberal Party (Venstre)	7
Local List(s) (Lokale lister)	6
Total number of members:	20
Note: Due to the German occupation of Norway during World War II, no elections were held for new municipal councils until after the war ended in 1945.

=== Mayors ===
The mayor (Norwegian: ordfører) of Sannidal Municipality was the political leader of the municipality and the chairperson of the municipal council. The following people have held this position:

- 1838–1840: Niels Halvorsen Dahl
- 1841–1851: Arnold Bentsen
- 1851–1854: Alf Olsen
- 1855–1862: Jørgen Blankenberg
- 1863–1866: Johan Dahll
- 1867–1870: Jørgen Blankenberg
- 1871–1874: Peder Rinde (V)
- 1875–1878: Tellef Dahll
- 1879–1887: Peder Rinde (V)
- 1888–1889: Knut Haugland
- 1890–1893: Peder Jakob Nesland
- 1894–1895: H. Fuglestvedt
- 1896–1897: Johan Nossen
- 1898–1898: H. Fuglestvedt
- 1899–1904: Johan Nossen
- 1905–1913: Thor Moe
- 1914–1916: Thor Nyhus
- 1917–1919: Thor Moe
- 1920–1922: Eilert J. Farsjø
- 1923–1928: Alf H. Larsen
- 1929–1937: Eilert J. Farsjø
- 1938–1941: Torkell Tande (V)
- 1941–1942: Erling Mørland (NS)
- 1943–1945: Erik Moland (NS)
- 1945–1945: Torkell Tande (V)
- 1945–1955: Eigil Olaf Liane (Ap)
- 1955–1959: Per Holte (Ap)

== See also ==
- List of former municipalities of Norway
