= Geir Borgan Paulsen =

Norwegian weightlifter (born 1957)

Personal information
- Citizenship: Norwegian
- Born: April 9, 1957 (age 69) Kragerø, Telemark, Norway
- Occupations: Gym owner, personal trainer
- Years active: 1970s–2002 (weightlifting & bodybuilding)
- Height: 1.79 m (5 ft 10 in)
- Weight: 110–112 kg (243–247 lb) (competition)

Sport
- Sport: Weightlifting, Bodybuilding
- Weight class: Heavyweight

Geir Borgan Paulsen (born 9 April 1957) is a Norwegian weightlifter and IFBB Pro bodybuilder active in the 1990s. His highest placings in professional bodybuilding were at the 1991 Night of the Champions on New York, placing third, and at the Master's Olympia in 2002, also placing third. He was a competitive weightlifter until the age of 26, when due to a work injury he was forced to retire from competitive weightlifting and became introduced to bodybuilding by a friend. He has also been a championship football (soccer) player, skier and skater.

He is a native of the island city of Kragerø in Telemark, Norway, where he was born on 9 April 1957. He now operates a gym in Oslo and works as a personal trainer.

== Bodybuilding career ==
Sources: Bodybuilding.com bio, Geirborganpaulsen.com Merits section

- 1982 IFBB European Amateur Championship (10th)
- 1983 IFBB European Amateur Championship (7th)
- 1984 IFBB World Amateur Championship (7th)
- 1985 IFBB World Amateur Championship (7th)
- 1986 IFBB European Amateur Championships (heavyweight, 6th)
- 1987 IFBB World Amateur Championships (heavyweight, 2nd)
- 1990 IFBB World Amateur Championships (heavyweight, 2nd)
- 1991 IFBB Grand Prix Denmark (8th)
- 1991 IFBB Grand Prix Finland (7th)
- 1991 IFBB Grand Prix Spain (8th)
- 1991 Mr Olympia, 16th
- 1991 IFBB Night of Champions, 3rd
- 1992 IFBB Night of Champions, 10th
- 1992 IFBB Pittsburgh Pro Invitational, 12th
- 1995 IFBB Houston Pro Invitational, 10th
- 1995 IFBB Night of the Champions, 18th
- 1997 IFBB Grand Prix Finland, 10th
- 2002 Master Olympia, 3rd

== Weightlifting career ==
Source: Geirborganpaulsen.com Merits section

- 1976 World Championship Junior, 9th
- 1976 European Championship Junior, 6th
- 1977 Nordic Championship Junior, 2nd
- 1978 European Championship 13th
- 1978 Grenland Atlet club team gold
- Norwegian Championship 2nd (3 times)
- Norwegian records as Junior 9 times
