= Skåtøy =

Island in Telemark, Norway

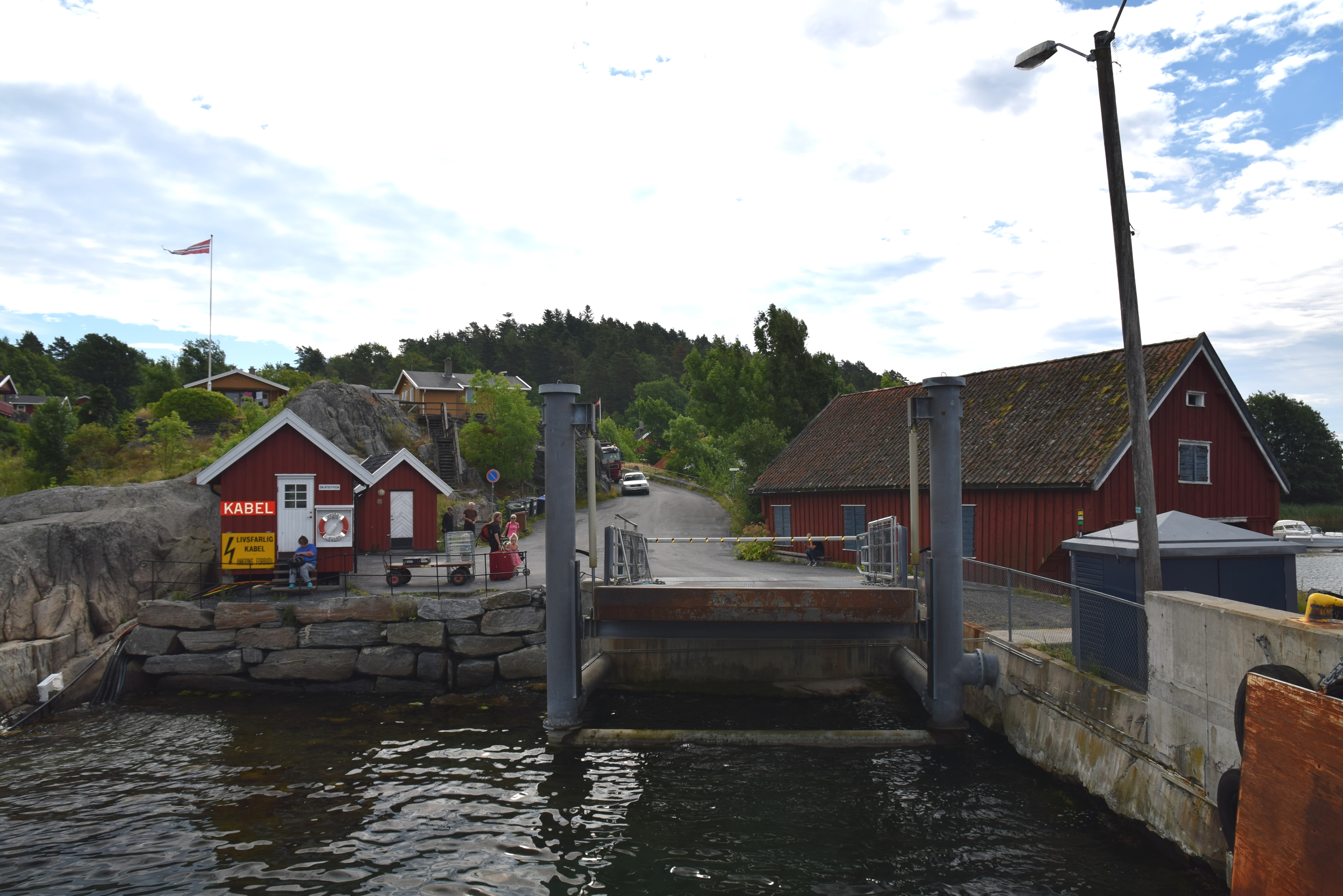
- Ferry quay at Skåtøy
- Interactive map of the island

Geography
- Location: Telemark, Norway
- Coordinates: 58.86406°N 9.5091°E
- Archipelago: Kragerø
- Area: 8.8 km^{2} (3.4 sq mi)
- Length: 6 km (3.7 mi)
- Width: 3 km (1.9 mi)
- Highest elevation: 62 m (203 ft)

Administration
- Norway
- County: Telemark
- Municipality: Kragerø Municipality

Demographics
- Population: 250 (2023)

Skåtøy is an island in Kragerø Municipality in Telemark county, Norway. The 8.8-square-kilometre (3.4 sq mi) island is the largest of all of the islands and skerries off the coast of Kragerø. It is located about 2 kilometres (1.2 mi) to the east of the town of Kragerø and the islands of Tåtøy and Øya. The island of Jomfruland lies about 2 kilometres (1.2 mi) to the east of Skåtøy. The Jomfruland National Park lies just to the east of the island. Skåtøy Church is located in the central part of the island. The church is nicknamed the "cathedral of the skerries".

The partially wooded island has a permanent population of about 250 people, but the island is a popular holiday and summer destination with many vacation homes on the island. Every year since 2000, Skåtøy residents have held the Skåtøy poetry festival Skåtøy Vise in mid-July. Kragerø Fjordbåtselskap runs a ferry throughout the Kragerø archipelago which connects Skåtøy to both the village of Stabbestad and the town of Kragerø on the mainland.

== History ==
Historically, the island was part of the old Skåtøy Municipality which existed from 1882 until 1960 when it became part of Kragerø Municipality.

=== Name ===
The municipality (originally the parish) is named after the island of Skåtøy (Old Norse: Skotøy) since the first Skåtøy Church was built there. The first element is identical to the word skot which means "overhang" or "projection of land". The last element is identical to the word øy which means "island". Prior to the 1917 Norwegian language reform law, the name was written "Skaatø". Then in 1918, the spelling was changed to "Skaatøy" to replace the Danish spelling of island (ø) with the Norwegian spelling (øy). The name was originally spelled with the digraph "aa", in 1920, the spelling was changed again, dropping the digraph and using the letter å was used instead.

== See also ==
- List of islands of Norway
