= Støle Church =

Church in Telemark, Norway

- Støle kirke
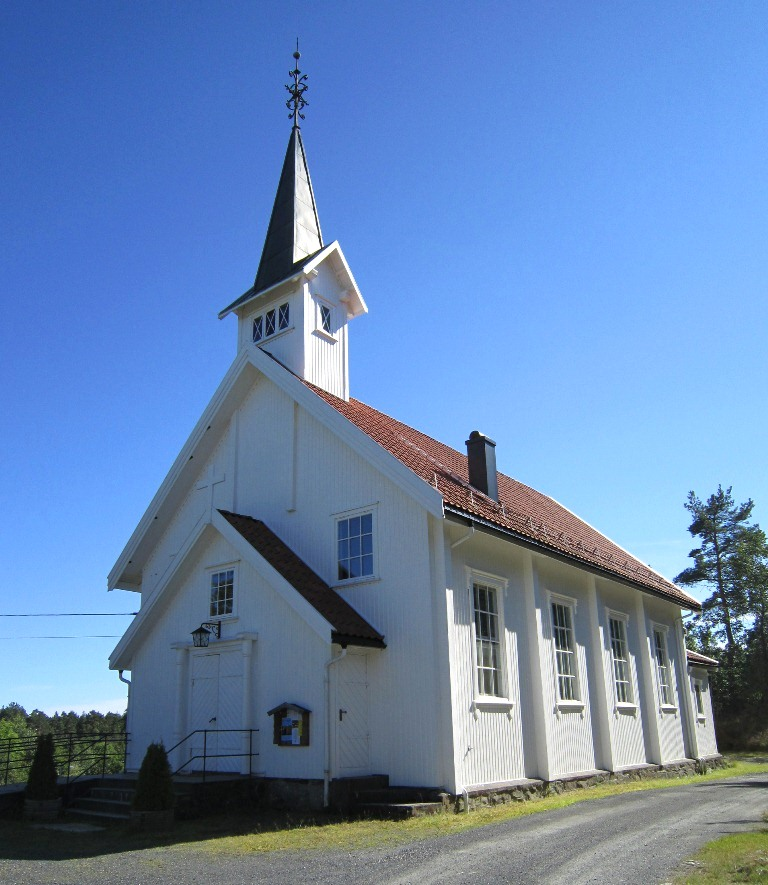
- View of the church
- Støle Church
- 58°49′12″N 9°22′34″E
- Location: Kragerø Municipality, Telemark
- Country: Norway
- Denomination: Church of Norway
- Churchmanship: Evangelical Lutheran

History
- Status: Parish church
- Founded: 1892
- Consecrated: 6 Sept 1892

Architecture
- Functional status: Active
- Architect: Adolf Schirmer
- Architectural type: Long church
- Completed: 1892 (134 years ago)

Specifications
- Capacity: 215
- Materials: Wood

Administration
- Diocese: Agder og Telemark
- Deanery: Bamble prosti
- Parish: Levangsheia
- Norwegian Cultural Heritage Site
- Type: Church
- Status: Not protected
- ID: 84296

Støle Church (Norwegian: Støle kirke) is a parish church of the Church of Norway in Kragerø Municipality in Telemark county, Norway. It is located in the village of Støle. It is the church for the Levangsheia parish which is part of the Bamble prosti (deanery) in the Diocese of Agder og Telemark. The white, wooden church was built in a long church design in 1892 using plans drawn up by the architect Adolf Schirmer. The church seats about 215 people.

== History ==
In 1888, the people living in the Levangsheia area requested that an annex chapel be built so they could have a place closer to them, but this request was rejected. The people raised money on their own and persuaded a member of the Storting to support the idea, so the matter was finally approved. The new chapel was designed by Adolf Schirmer and it was built in 1892. The new building was consecrated on 6 September 1892 by the bishop. Originally, it was named Levangsheien Chapel. In the late 1900s, the chapel was upgraded to a parish church and it was renamed Støle Church.

== See also ==
- List of churches in Agder og Telemark
