= Charlotte Therkelsen =

Norwegian politician (born 1981)

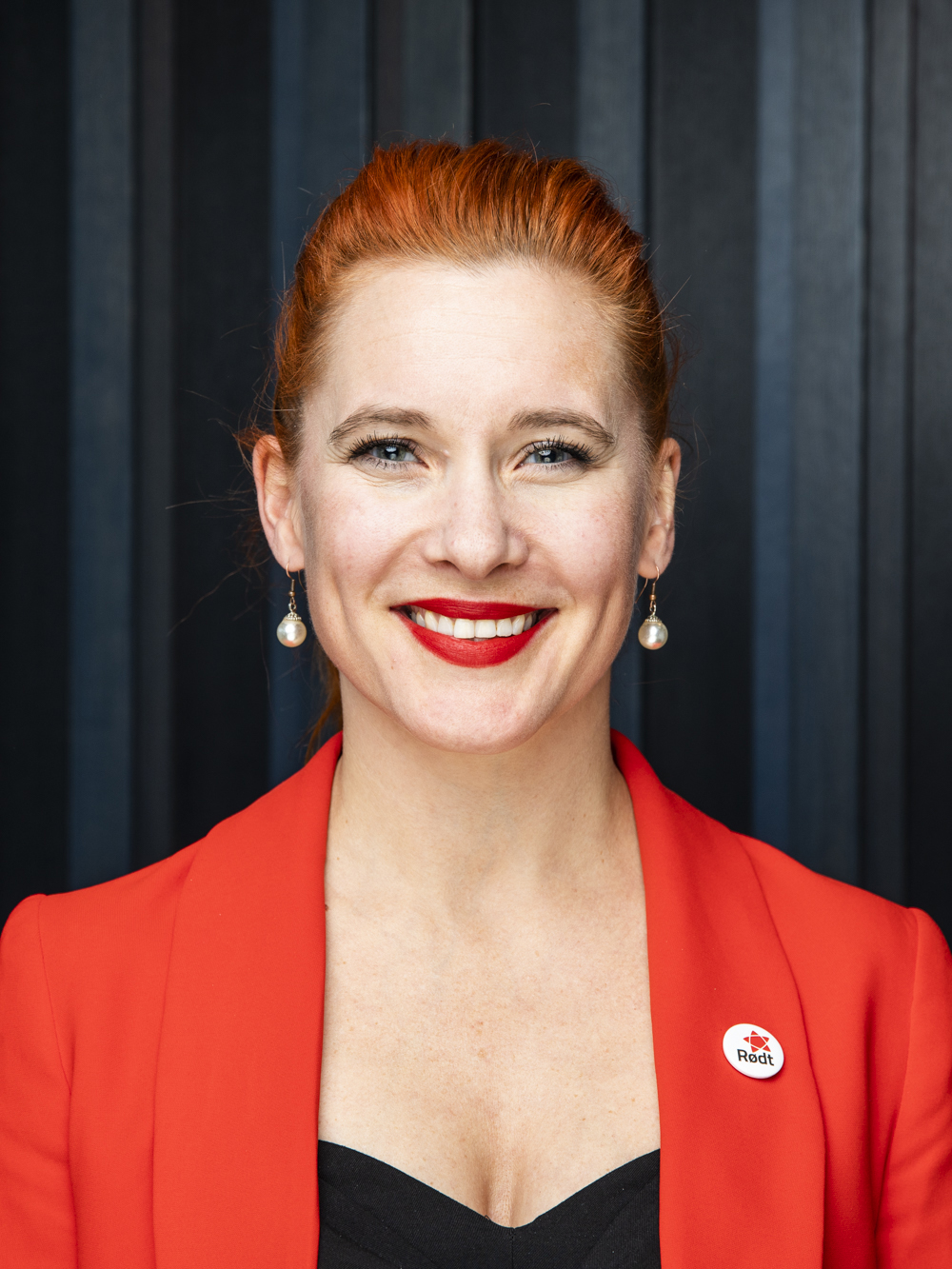

Mayor of Kragerø Municipality
- Incumbent
- Assumed office 19 October 2023
- Deputy: Jonas Nilsen
- Preceded by: Grunde Wegar Knudsen

Second Deputy Leader of the Red Party
- Incumbent
- Assumed office 22 April 2023
- Leader: Bjørnar Moxnes; Marie Sneve Martinussen
- Preceded by: Silje Josten Kjosbakken

Deputy Member of the Storting
- Incumbent
- Assumed office 1 October 2021
- Constituency: Telemark

Deputy Mayor of Kragerø
- In office 22 October 2015 – 17 October 2019
- Mayor: Jone Blikra
- Preceded by: Henriette Fluer Vikre
- Succeeded by: Jan Petter Abrahamsen

Personal details
- Born: 29 July 1981 (age 45)
- Party: Red
- Occupation: Politician

Charlotte Therkelsen (born 29 July 1981) is a Norwegian politician representing the Red Party. She has been a deputy representative to the Storting since 2021, the party's second deputy leader and the mayor of Kragerø Municipality since 2023.

== Political career ==
=== Parliament ===
A member of the Red Party, Therkelsen was elected deputy representative to the Storting from the constituency of Telemark for the period 2021–2025.

=== Deputy party leader ===
She was elected second deputy leader for the Red Party in April 2023.

=== Local politics ===
Therkelsen was deputy mayor in Kragerø Municipality from 2015 to 2019. She succeeded Henriette Fluer Vikre in the position and served with Jone Blikra as mayor. Following the 2019 local elections, she was succeeded by Jan Petter Abrahamsen. She was elected mayor of Kragerø following the 2023 local elections, with independent Jonas Nilsen as deputy mayor.

In September 2024, she expressed that the municipality of Kragerø was in a difficult economic situation, when Kragerø had been included in the Register for Governmental Approval of Financial Obligations (the ROBEK list), and the county governor had not approved the municipal budget for 2024.
