= Kil, Telemark =

Village in Kragerø Municipality, Norway

Kil Sannidal
- Village
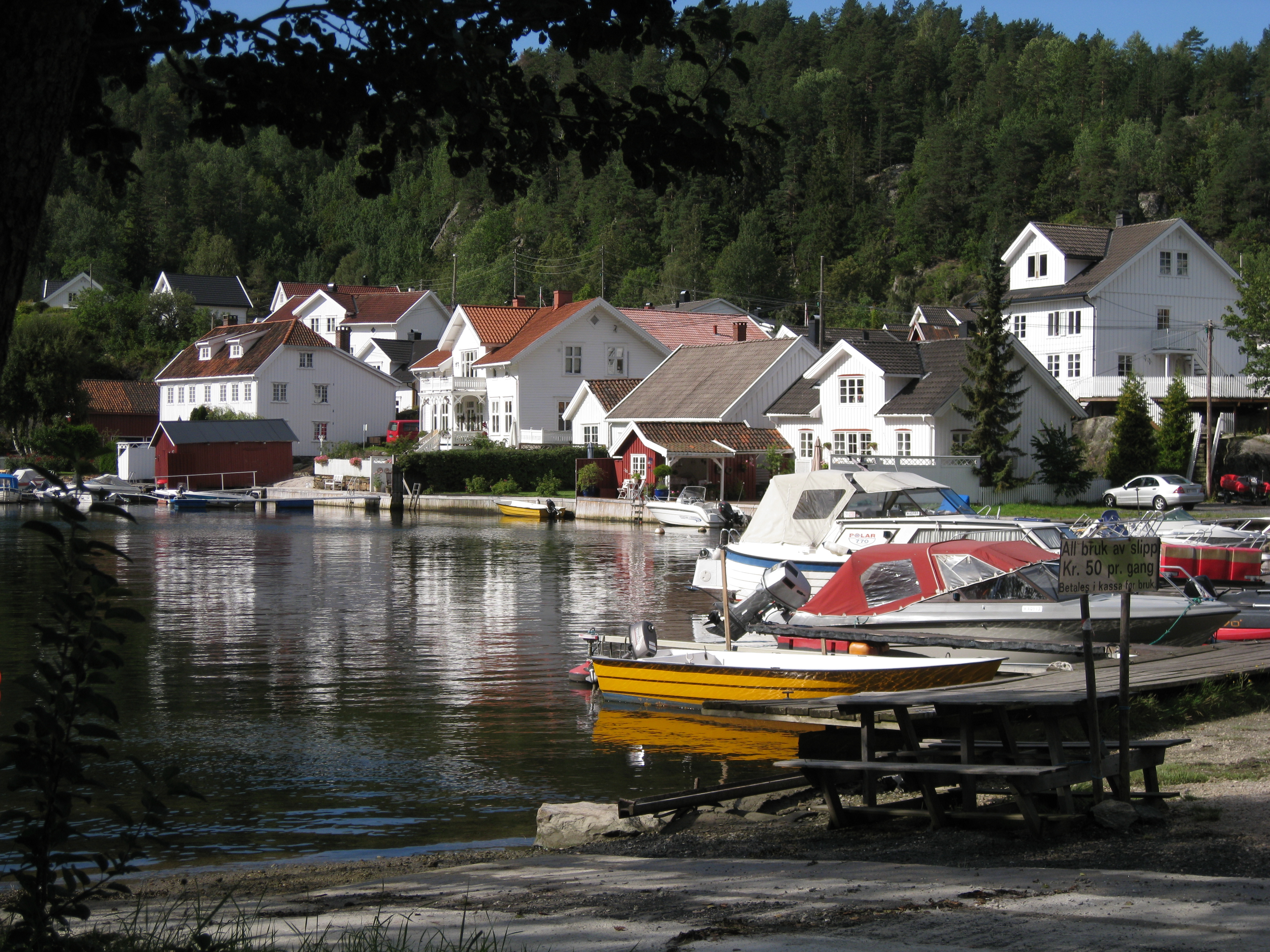
- View of the village
- Interactive map of the village
- Coordinates: 58.8905°N 9.30169°E
- Country: Norway
- Region: Eastern Norway
- County: Telemark
- District: Vestmar
- Municipality: Kragerø Municipality

Area
  - Total: 0.88 km^{2} (0.34 sq mi)
- Elevation: 6 m (20 ft)

Population (2025)
  - Total: 1,016
  - Density: 1,155/km^{2} (2,990/sq mi)
- Time zone: UTC+01:00 (CET)
  - Summer (DST): UTC+02:00 (CEST)
- Post Code: 3766 Sannidal

Kil or Sannidal is a village in Kragerø Municipality in Telemark county, Norway. The village is located along the European route E18 highway, at the innermost part of the Kilsfjorden. The village lies about 5 kilometres (3.1 mi) west of the villages of Vadfoss and Helle and about 10 kilometres (6.2 mi) to the northwest of the town of Kragerø. Sannidal Church is located just west of the village.

The 0.88-square-kilometre (220-acre) village has a population (2025) of 1,016 and a population density of 1,155 inhabitants per square kilometre (2,990/sq mi).

== History ==
Historically, the village of Kil was the administrative centre of the old Sannidal Municipality. Kil is an old port where timber and ice was loaded on boats and shipped elsewhere.
