= Sannidal Church =

Church in Telemark, Norway

- Sannidal kirke
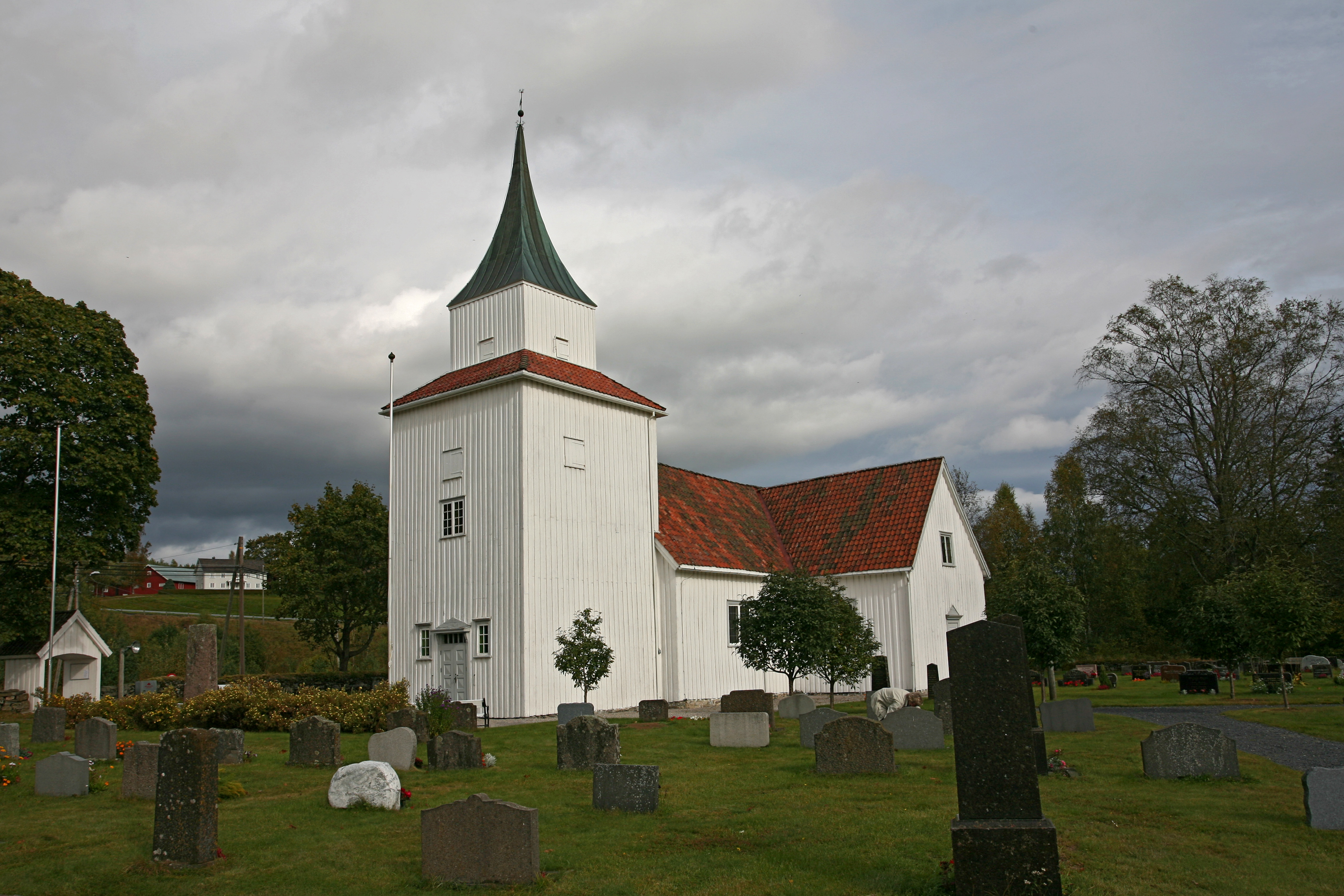
- View of the church
- Sannidal Church
- 58°53′36″N 9°15′58″E
- Location: Kragerø Municipality, Telemark
- Country: Norway
- Denomination: Church of Norway
- Previous denomination: Catholic Church
- Churchmanship: Evangelical Lutheran

History
- Status: Parish church
- Founded: c. 1200
- Consecrated: 1 Sept 1772

Architecture
- Functional status: Active
- Architectural type: Cruciform
- Completed: 1772 (254 years ago)

Specifications
- Capacity: 330
- Materials: Wood

Administration
- Diocese: Agder og Telemark
- Deanery: Bamble prosti
- Parish: Sannidal
- Norwegian Cultural Heritage Site
- Type: Church
- Status: Automatically protected
- ID: 85399

Sannidal Church (Norwegian: Sannidal kirke) is a parish church of the Church of Norway in Kragerø Municipality in Telemark county, Norway. It is located in the village of Sannidal. It is the church for the Sannidal parish which is part of the Bamble prosti (deanery) in the Diocese of Agder og Telemark. The white, wooden church was built in a cruciform design in 1772 using plans drawn up by an unknown architect. The church seats about 330 people.

The church lies next to the old main road going south from Oslo to Kristiansand. Outside the church there is a big churchyard with two tall monuments to commemorate the men lost at war. The one to the south of the church is a reminder of the Napoleonic Wars (1807–1814) when Norway was part of the Kingdom of Denmark-Norway and was fighting on Napoleon's side against the British fleet. The monument outside the church entrance was erected after World War II. Every year on the 8th of May (Norwegian Armistice Day) and on the 17th of May (Constitution Day), wreaths are laid at these monuments in honour of the men who gave their lives for King and country.

== History ==
The location of the church is notable since in pre-Christian times, before the years 1000–1100 in Norway, the place was used as a site for worshiping the old Norse gods. There was most probably a gudehov (pagan temple) located here.

The earliest existing historical records of the church date back to the year 1398 in Bishop Eystein's "red book", but the church was not built that year. The first church in Sannidal was a wooden stave church that was built around the year 1200. That church was located on the old Mo farm, on a small hill, about 50 metres (160 ft) to the southwest of the present church site. The church is said to have had a tower on the roof as well as open-air corridors surrounding the building. The stave church, at that time, was known as the Mo Church (since it was on the Mo farm) and it was dedicated to St. Laurentius, the Roman deacon burnt on the fire during the persecution of Christians in 258 under the emperor Valerian. In 1723, the church was sold into private ownership during the Norwegian church sale when the King sold the churches to pay off debts from the Great Northern War. A priest named Alstrup bought the church (and several other churches in the region). In 1738, the church was sold to a group of 20 local farmers. The maintenance had been neglected for a long time, and by this time it was said to be dilapidated as well as cold and drafty during the winters, but at that time it was not possible to find the money to repair the old stave church.

In 1766, Jakob Matssøn Lund was appointed parish priest in Kragerø and Sannidal. (At that time Sannidal did not have its own vicar or parish clerk, but rather shared one with Kragerø Church.) He was an able man who, in addition to studying theology, also had learned medicine and anatomy. He was the first to vaccinate against smallpox and also instrumental in organising the general education in the village in 1777. After becoming the priest, Lund became a big proponent of building a new church. In 1770, the old church was torn down and work on a new church began, although formal permission was not given until May 1772. The new church was built on a site about 50 metres (160 ft) to the northeast of where the old church had stood. It was a wooden, cruciform building with the chancel in the eastern transept. Remains of the old stave church can be seen in the present church. Some of the old planks are used in the floor and roof. Other remains are stored at Norsk Folkemuseum in Oslo where the pulpit and altarpiece are now displayed. The church was completed on 1 September 1772. In 1774, the owners of the church gifted its ownership to all the villagers, who agreed to maintain it. In 1803, a tower was built. In 1814, a sacristy was built.

In 1814, this church served as an election church (Norwegian: valgkirke). Together with more than 300 other parish churches across Norway, it was a polling station for elections to the 1814 Norwegian Constituent Assembly which wrote the Constitution of Norway. This was Norway's first national elections. Each church parish was a constituency that elected people called "electors" who later met together in each county to elect the representatives for the assembly that was to meet at Eidsvoll Manor later that year.

The church was renovated in 1883. In the period after 1910, there was talk of moving the church to a more central location in the parish, but this was rejected. The church renovated again in 1943 when the windows were returned to their original, slightly smaller size. The building was also renovated in 1951 and in 1972. During work on the interior ceiling in the winter of 2009–2010, old painted ceiling decorations were uncovered, but it was decided to paint over them.

== Interior ==
=== Church vestibule ===
The Church vestibule was restored for the 200-year-Jubilee in 1972 by recommendation of the Chief Inspector of Historic Buildings. It houses a grave plate cast at Mørland foundry in Kjølebrønd, in olden times a very busy place, south along the Kilsfjord. The foundry was operational from 1641–1665 and the grave plate is from 1643 with the name Anna Krefting on it, probably the wife of Herman Krefting, who operated the foundry in its first years.

The old entrance door displayed on the south wall is from the old stave church as are the wooden entrance pillars on both sides of the door to the church nave. A small sword used to protect oneself on the way to church is also displayed on the south wall. Wild animals and robbers were a common occurrence in Norway, in fact so common that the Norwegian name for the vestibule is våpenhuset, the place to store weapons. Weapons are not to be worn in the room where Christ the Saviour is worshiped. A visitor to a Sunday service at the church might notice some people wear a sheathed knife in their belt: in Sannidal this is not a weapon, but is a most important tool for the Sannidøl, the home of many famous knife smiths and makers. A portrait gallery of vicars is also to be seen on the south wall. The longest reigning vicar, Torkell Tande, was also a member of parliament for many years.

=== Nave ===
The pulpit was donated by Knut Knutsen Dobbe and made in the early 19th century in a late Louis XVI style modeled along antique ideas. It is carved by Peder Olsen, a foundry model maker who worked at the Bolvig, Froland og Egelands foundry. The old soapstone christening font dates back to 1200. Next to the pulpit and the reader's chair there are two Gothic style two-armed candlestick holders going back to the 15th century. The importance of timber and later ice export on sailing ships for the area can be seen in the warrior sailing ship with cannons ready to fight for Christ.

=== Altar ===
The silver and Eucharist vessels on the altar also date back to the stave church and were given as gifts in the beginning of the 18th century. The storage case for the Eucharist bread was a gift from the skipper and the owner of the skip Patriarchen Jacob in thanks to God for intervening and saving the ship off the coast of Holland in 1703. A wine mug in silver was given in 1708 by skipper Olle Nielsøn and both his sons Niels and Jon Olesøn together with seven others. The intention was "to honour God and for beautifying of the altar in Sannidal church", according to the Norwegian engraved on it. The altar piece showing the crucifixion of Christ comes from the old "Christi kirke" in Kragerø dismantled in 1870. The piece is from the 17th century.

A Frederik II edition Bible, printed in Copenhagen in 1589 lies on the altar, donated by Nils Jensen Farsjø. The eye on the top of the altarpiece is decorated with painted cherubs and radiating light; it probably also comes from the old "Christi kirke".

== Other buildings ==
Near to the church is the "Kirkestua", an old school building that was converted into a church building. Today it is used as an office for the vicar and church clerk as well as a meeting place for small groups. It is also used for confirmation classes. Traditionally, the large majority of Norwegian youth get confirmed while in their 9th school year. Confirmation is one of the main family gatherings and is a big feast day on the church calendar at the beginning of May.

The white house on the northern side of the road is the mission chapel run by Mo Evangelic Lutheran home mission. It is used for Christian meetings as well as a place for family gatherings after important church functions such as confirmations, weddings, christenings and burials. Bygdetunet is located approximately 500 metres (1,600 ft) to the west. This is a living museum exhibiting old houses from the area. This site is also used for important village gatherings such as 17 May celebration.

== See also ==
- List of churches in Agder og Telemark
