= Kragerø Church =

Church in Telemark, Norway

- Kragerø kirke
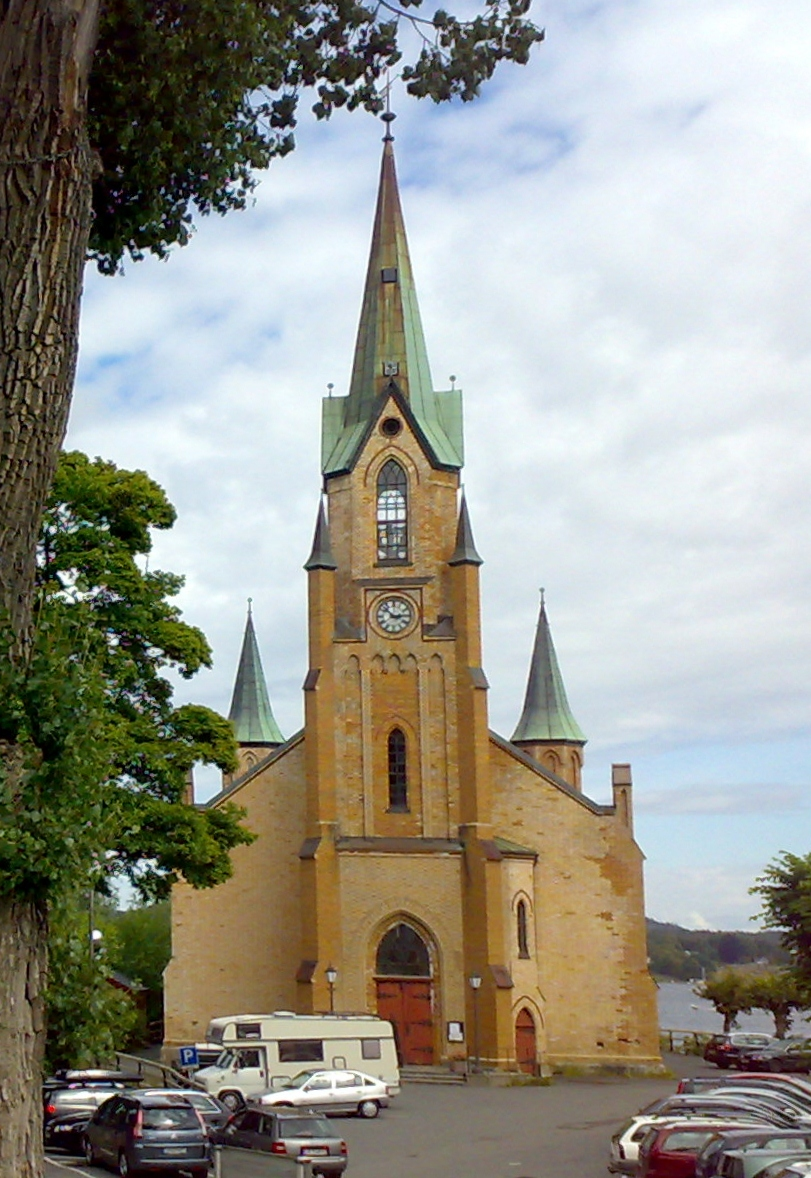
- View of the church
- Kragerø Church
- 58°52′16″N 9°24′52″E
- Location: Kragerø Municipality, Telemark
- Country: Norway
- Denomination: Church of Norway
- Churchmanship: Evangelical Lutheran

History
- Status: Parish church
- Founded: 1652
- Consecrated: 23 Sept 1870

Architecture
- Functional status: Active
- Architect: Georg Andreas Bull
- Architectural type: Long church
- Completed: 1870 (156 years ago)

Specifications
- Capacity: 700
- Materials: Wood

Administration
- Diocese: Agder og Telemark
- Deanery: Bamble prosti
- Parish: Kragerø
- Norwegian Cultural Heritage Site
- Type: Church
- Status: Automatically protected
- ID: 84834

Kragerø Church (Norwegian: Kragerø kirke) is a parish church of the Church of Norway in Kragerø Municipality in Telemark county, Norway. It is located in the town of Kragerø. It is the church for the Kragerø parish which is part of the Bamble prosti (deanery) in the Diocese of Agder og Telemark. The yellow, brick church was built in a long church design in 1870 using plans drawn up by the architect Georg Andreas Bull. The church seats about 700 people.

== History ==
Kragerø was originally part of the Sannidal Church parish, but the road there was not good. In 1651, the people of Kragerø requested to build their own church in the village (which at that time was a small place with about 300 inhabitants). The new church was built using private, collected funds that were donated by the local people. The new building was consecrated on 1 November 1652, and it was called "Christ Church" (Norwegian: Christi kirke). It was a cruciform church that was somewhat similar to the nearby Sannidal Church. In 1666, Kragerø was granted kjøpstad (town) status which led to a growth in population over the next century or so. In 1785, a new bell tower was built on the church.

By the 1860s, the town of Kragerø had grown to a population was nearing 5,000 people, so the church was no longer large enough for the parish. The new church was built a little to the east of the old church yard after some other buildings were torn down. The new church was designed by Georg Andreas Bull. On 23 September 1870, it was consecrated by Bishop Jacob von der Lippe. The new building is a long church built out of yellow-colored brick. The church is located on an embankment and is clearly visible from the sea, particularly noticeable are the large bell tower and the two small towers by the choir. The choir is surrounded by vestries. At the dedication, the church had room for approximately 800 people. This was too small, and it is said that the architect reluctantly agreed to design second floor seating galleries for the church, so that the capacity was increased by 300 to 1,100 seats in 1878. For the church's 125th anniversary in 1995, the galleries were removed, except the organ gallery in the back of the church. Throughout the church's history, there have been quite a few problems with the brick, which has not withstood the climate very well. It has been necessary to replace parts of the facade over the years.

== Media gallery ==
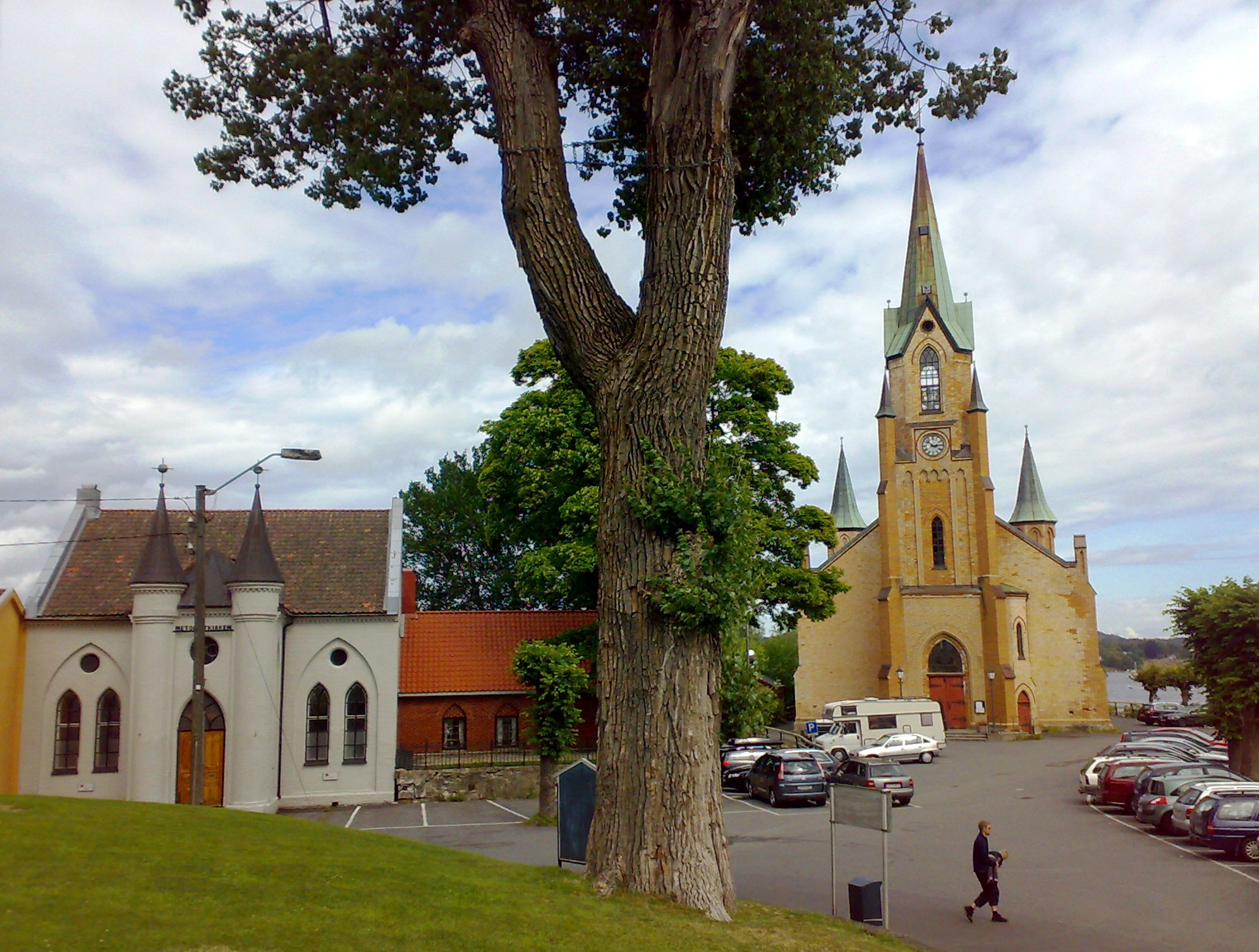

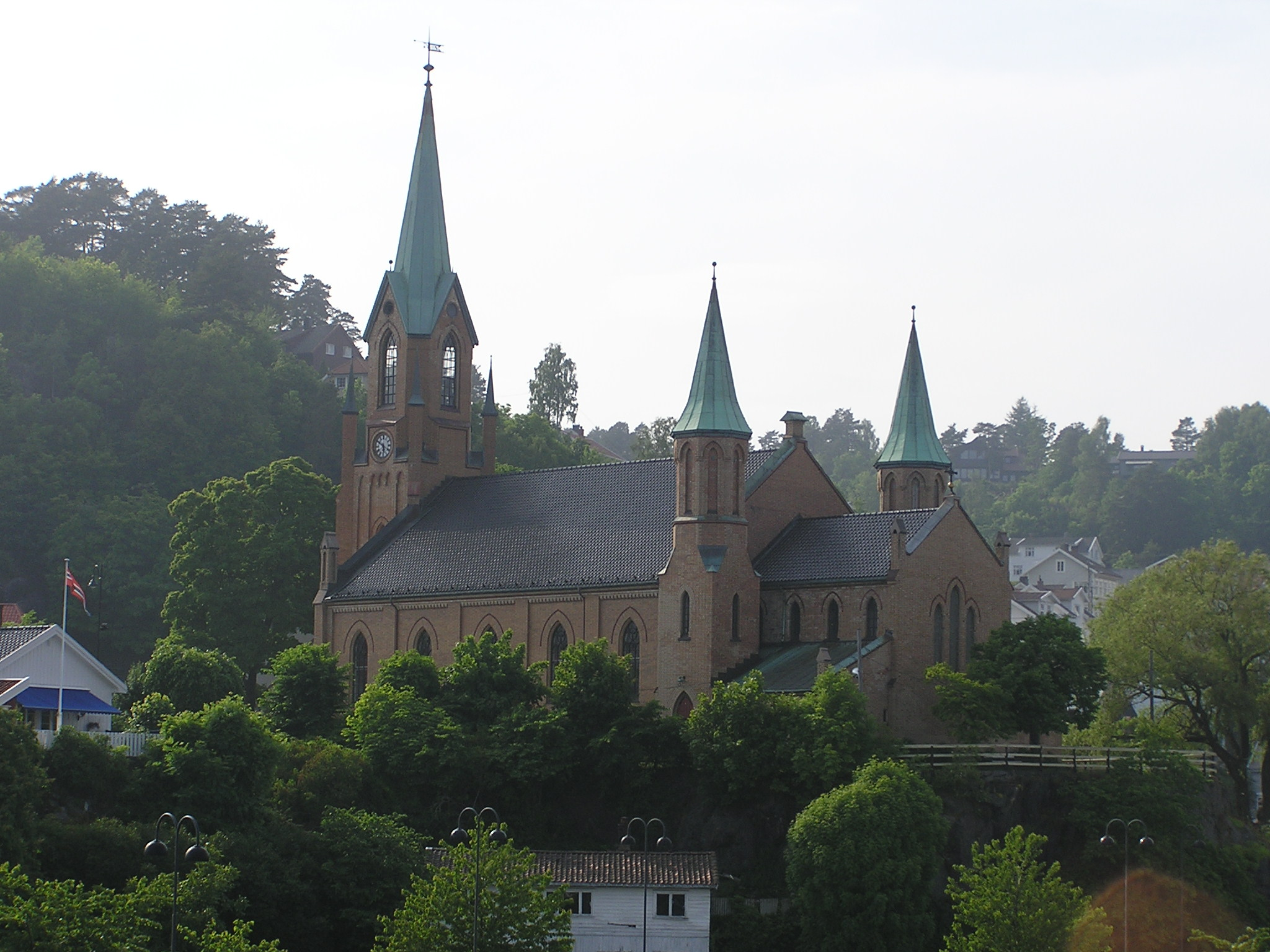

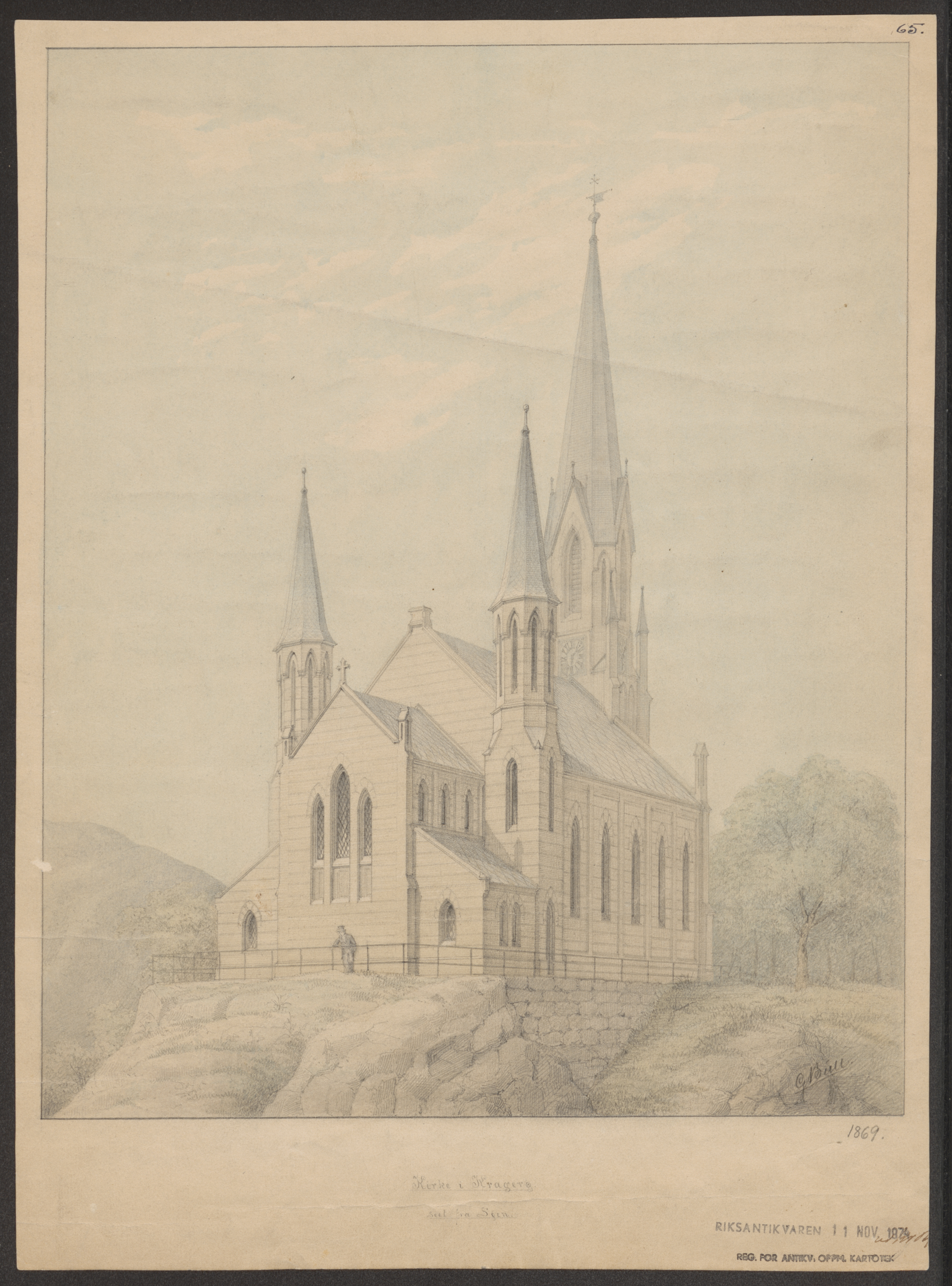

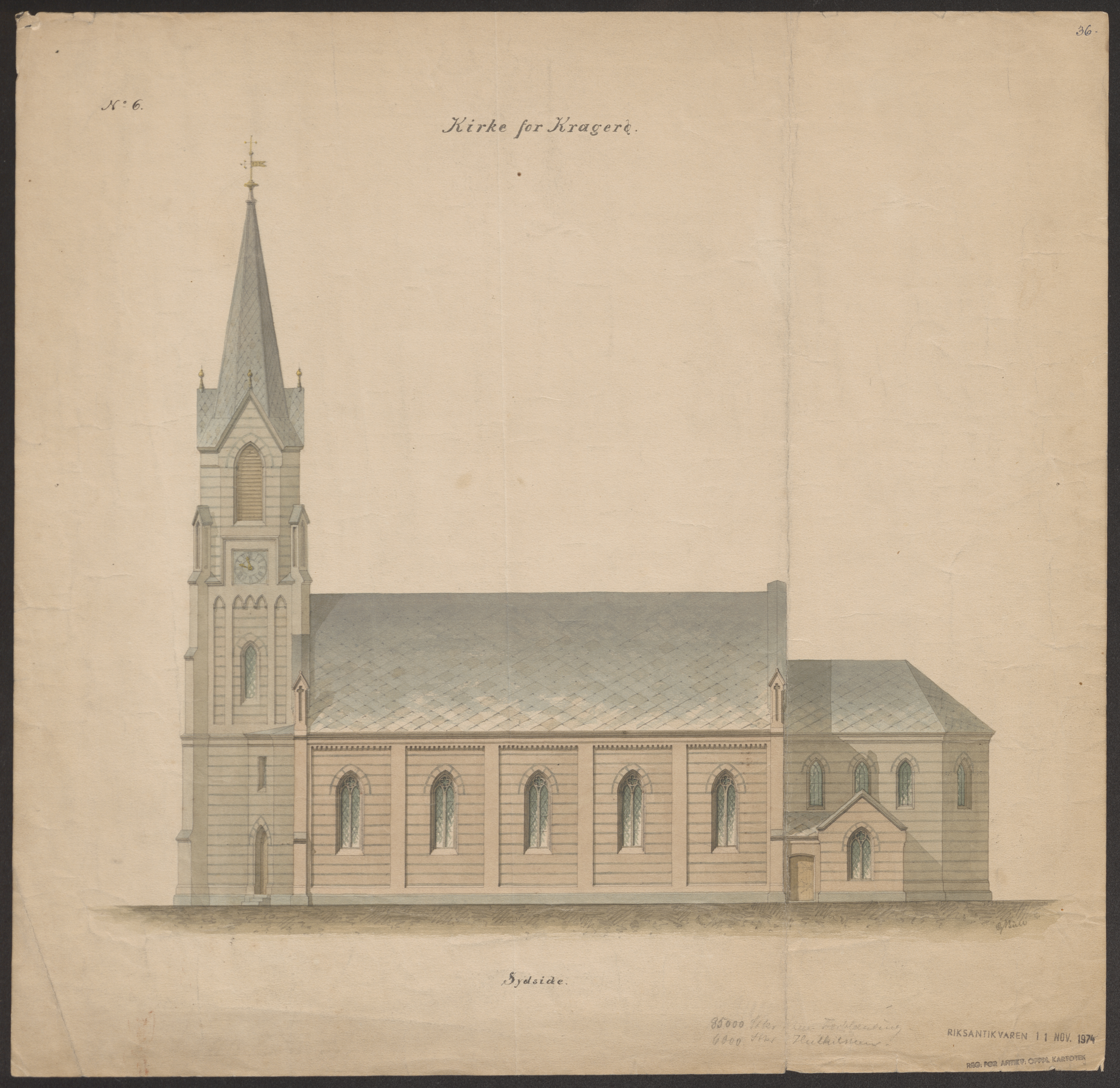

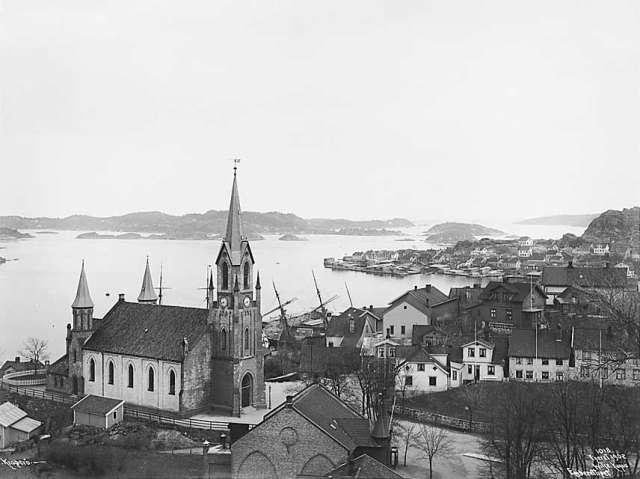

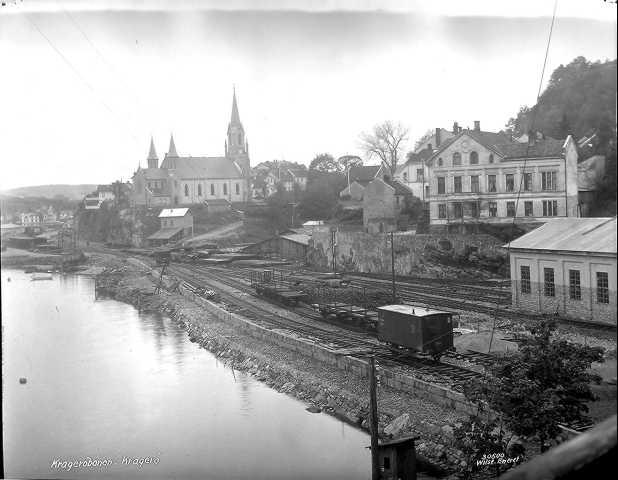

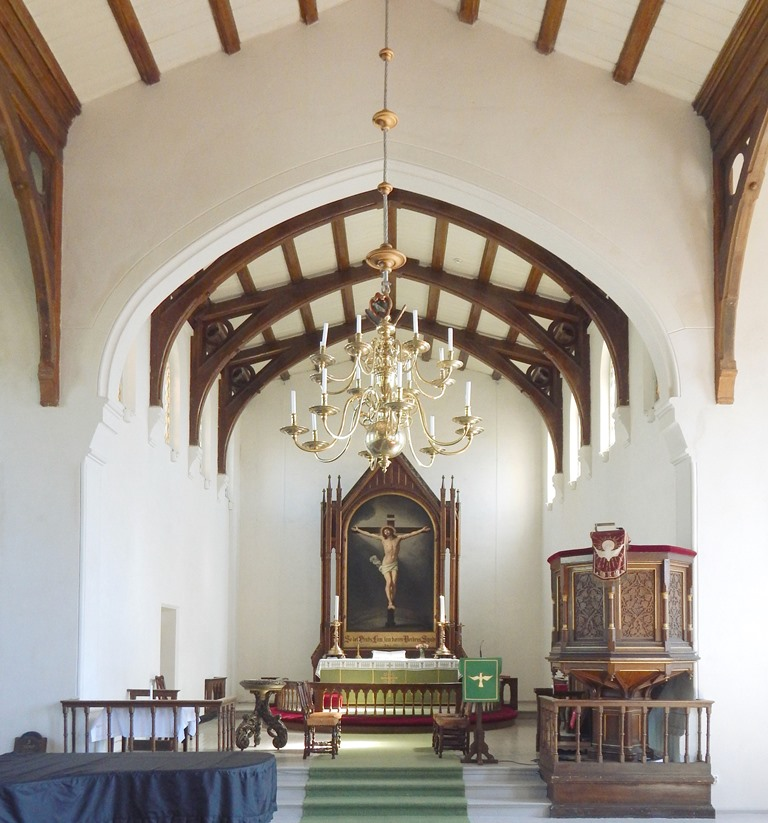

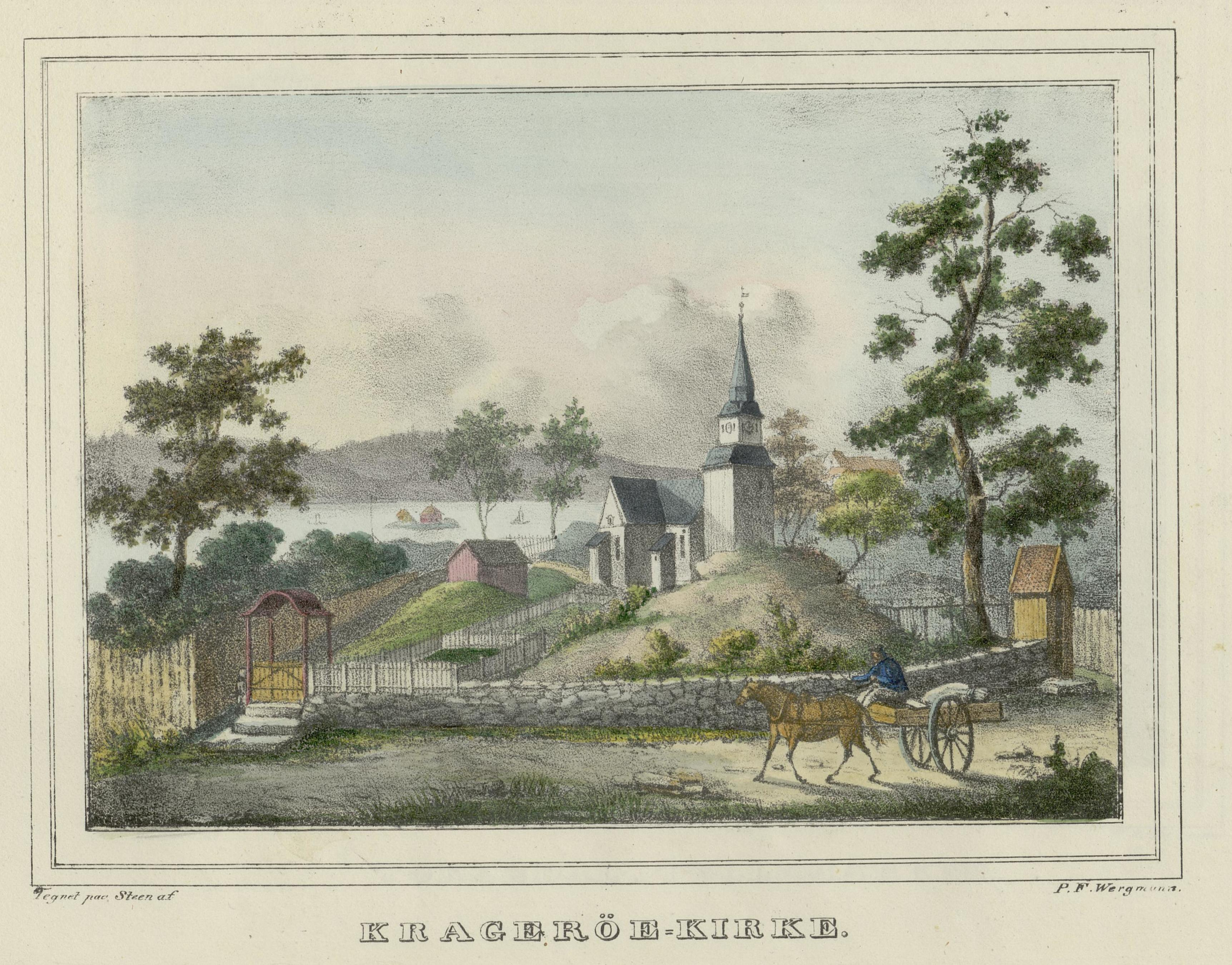
Painting of the old church (1652-1870)

== See also ==
- List of churches in Agder og Telemark
