= Øya, Telemark =

Island in Telemark, Norway

Øya Kragerø (historic)
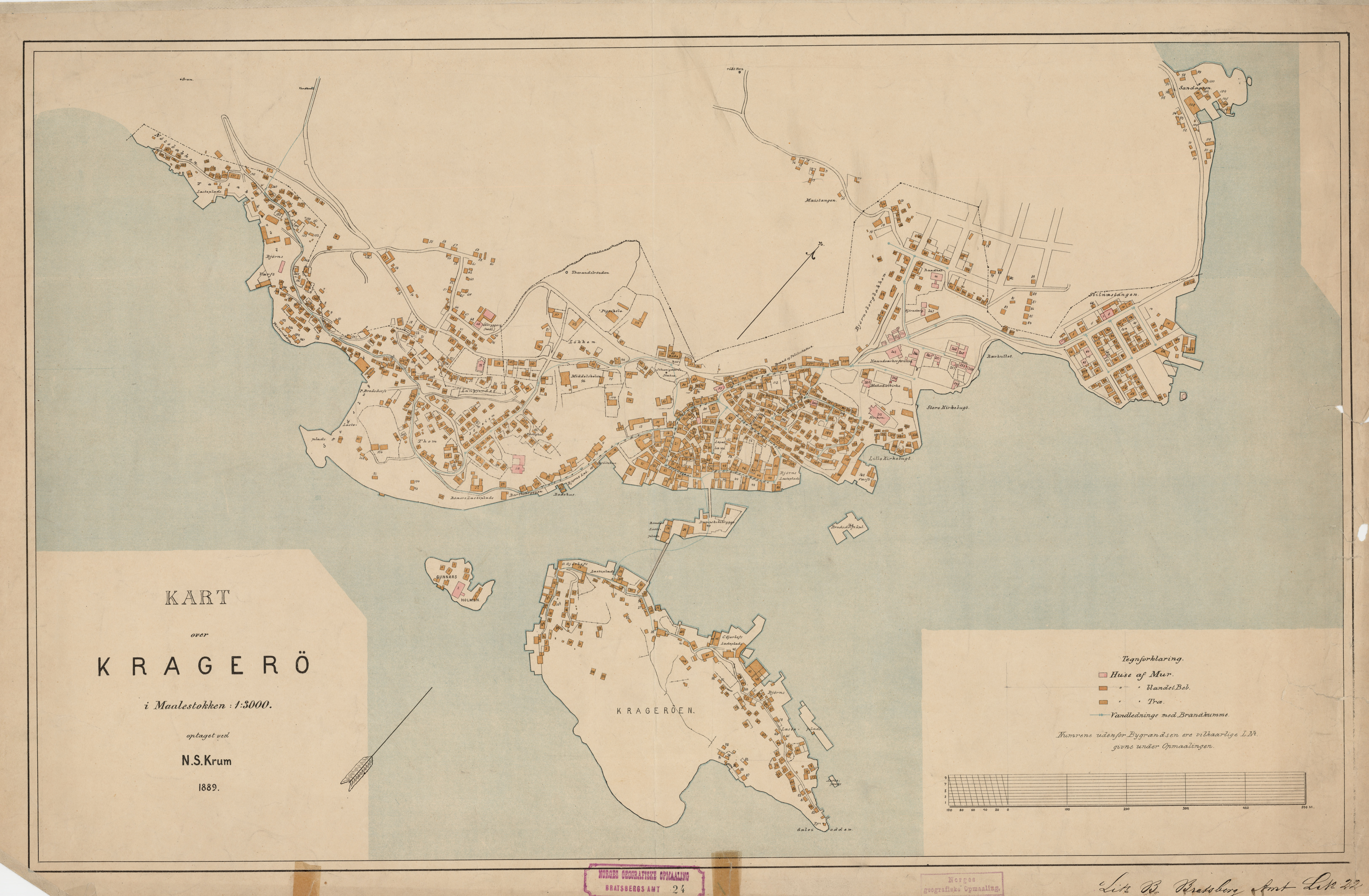
- Map of the town of Kragerø (1889), showing the island and bridge
- Interactive map of the island

Geography
- Location: Telemark, Norway
- Coordinates: 58.86584°N 9.4158°E
- Archipelago: Kragerø
- Area: 13 km^{2} (5.0 sq mi)
- Length: 640 m (2100 ft)
- Width: 400 m (1300 ft)
- Coastline: 1.8 km (1.12 mi)
- Highest elevation: 51 m (167 ft)
- Highest point: Veten

Administration
- Norway
- County: Telemark
- Municipality: Kragerø Municipality

Øya (or historically Kragerø) is an island in Kragerø Municipality in Telemark county, Norway. The 13-hectare (32-acre) island lies about 70 metres (230 ft) off the mainland shore of the town of Kragerø. It is connected to the mainland by a road bridge. The town of Kragerø began along the small strait of water between the island and the mainland, and the name of the new town was Kragerø, after the island upon which it was partially located. Today the island is considered part of the centre of the town of Kragerø.

== See also ==
- List of islands of Norway
