= Kragerø Municipality =

Municipality in Telemark, Norway

Kragerø Municipality Kragerø kommune
- Municipality
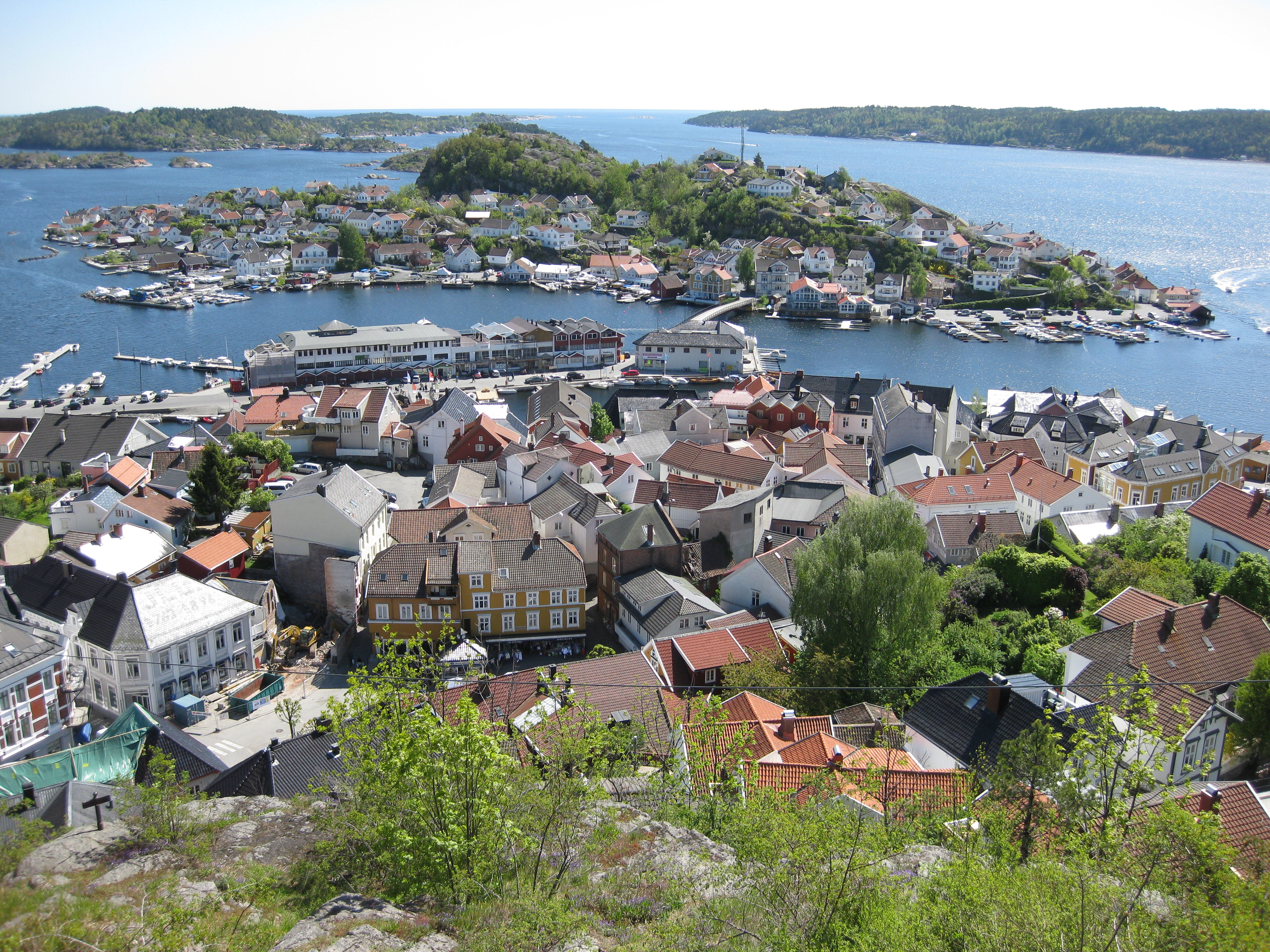

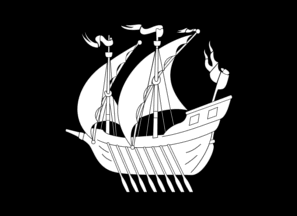
- Flag Coat of arms

- Telemark within Norway

- Kragerø within Telemark
- Coordinates: 58°53′13″N 9°20′49″E
- Country: Norway
- County: Telemark
- District: Vestmar
- Established: 1 Jan 1838
  - Created as: Formannskapsdistrikt
- Administrative centre: Kragerø

Government
  - Mayor (2023): Charlotte Therkelsen (R)

Area
  - Total: 305.47 km^{2} (117.94 sq mi)
  - Land: 288.64 km^{2} (111.44 sq mi)
  - Water: 16.83 km^{2} (6.50 sq mi) 5.5%
  - Rank: #262 in Norway
- Highest elevation (Store Valefjell): 329.16 m (1,079.9 ft)

Population (2026)
  - Total: 10,378
  - Rank: #111 in Norway
  - Density: 36/km^{2} (93/sq mi)
  - Change (10 years): ▼ −2.2%
- Demonym: Kragerøværing

Official language
  - Norwegian form: Neutral
- Time zone: UTC+01:00 (CET)
  - Summer (DST): UTC+02:00 (CEST)
- ISO 3166 code: NO-4014
- Website: Official website

Kragerø (Norwegian pronunciation: [ˈkrɑ̀ːɡərœ]; locally [ˈkʁɑ̀ːɡəʁøː]) is a municipality in Telemark county, Norway. It is located in the traditional districts of Grenland and the smaller Vestmar. The administrative centre of the municipality is the town of Kragerø. Villages in Kragerø include Helle, Vadfoss, Kil, and Portør.

The 305.47-square-kilometre (117.94 sq mi) municipality is the 262nd largest by area out of the 357 municipalities in Norway. Kragerø Municipality is the 111th most populous municipality in Norway with a population of 10,378. The municipality's population density is 36 inhabitants per square kilometre (93/sq mi) and its population has decreased by 2.2% over the previous 10-year period.

In the days of the sailing ships, the town of Kragerø was one of Norway's largest port cities. The London-based newspaper The Independent, published an article on Kragerø stating that "When Norwegians want to get away from it all they head for Kragero. Forests, fjords and islands await them at the place where Edvard Munch found peace and relaxation." The population of Kragerø Municipality quadruples during its summer months due to high tourism. Edvard Munch fell in love with Kragerø in his time, and called it "The Pearl of the Coastal Towns" (Perlen blandt kystbyene.) In 2002, The Independent published an article on the region's coastline saying that "It may not have many sandy beaches, but the coast of Norway offers sophistication and stunning scenery."

== General information ==
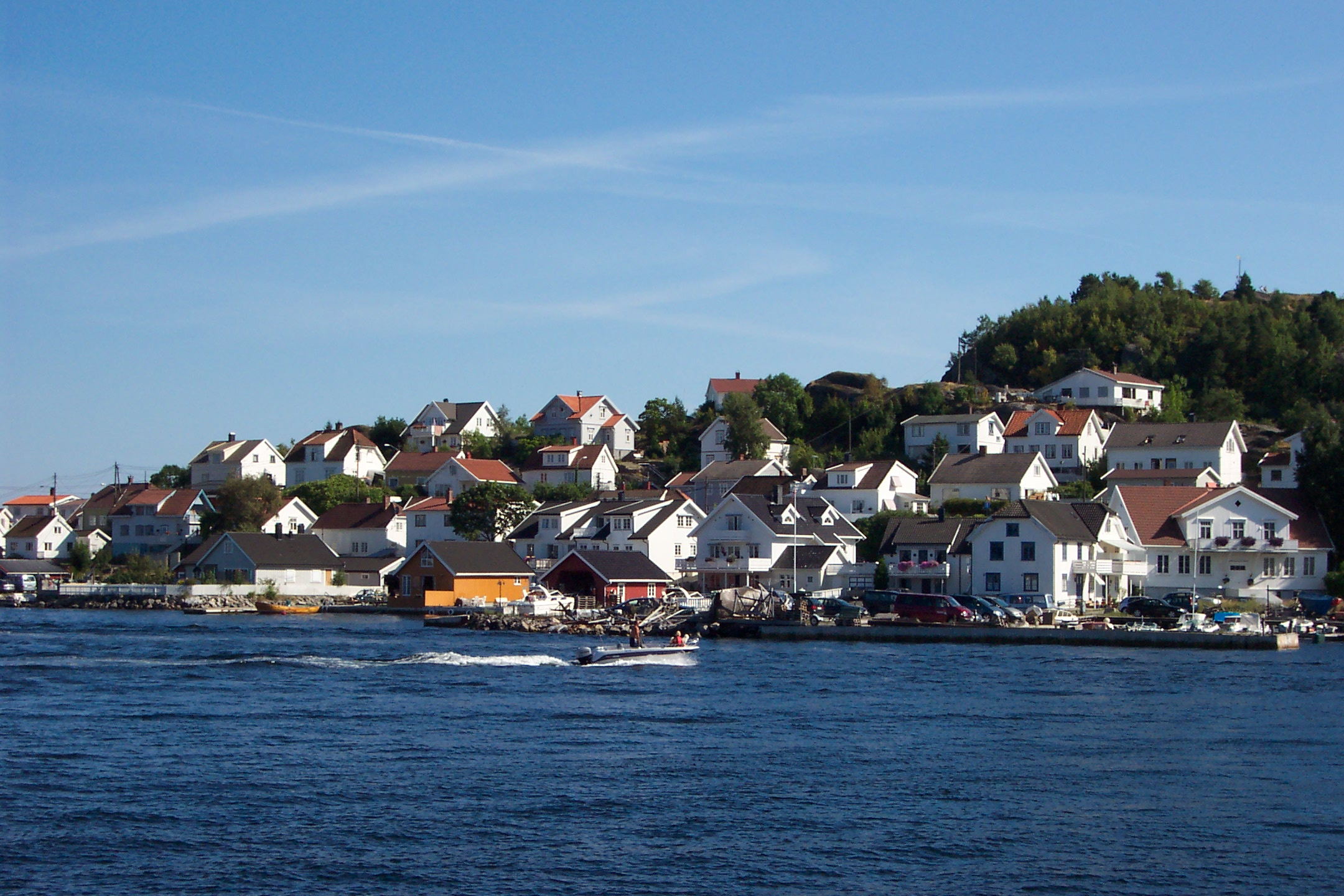
Øya in Kragerø seen from the town. Credit: Ståle Kristoffersen

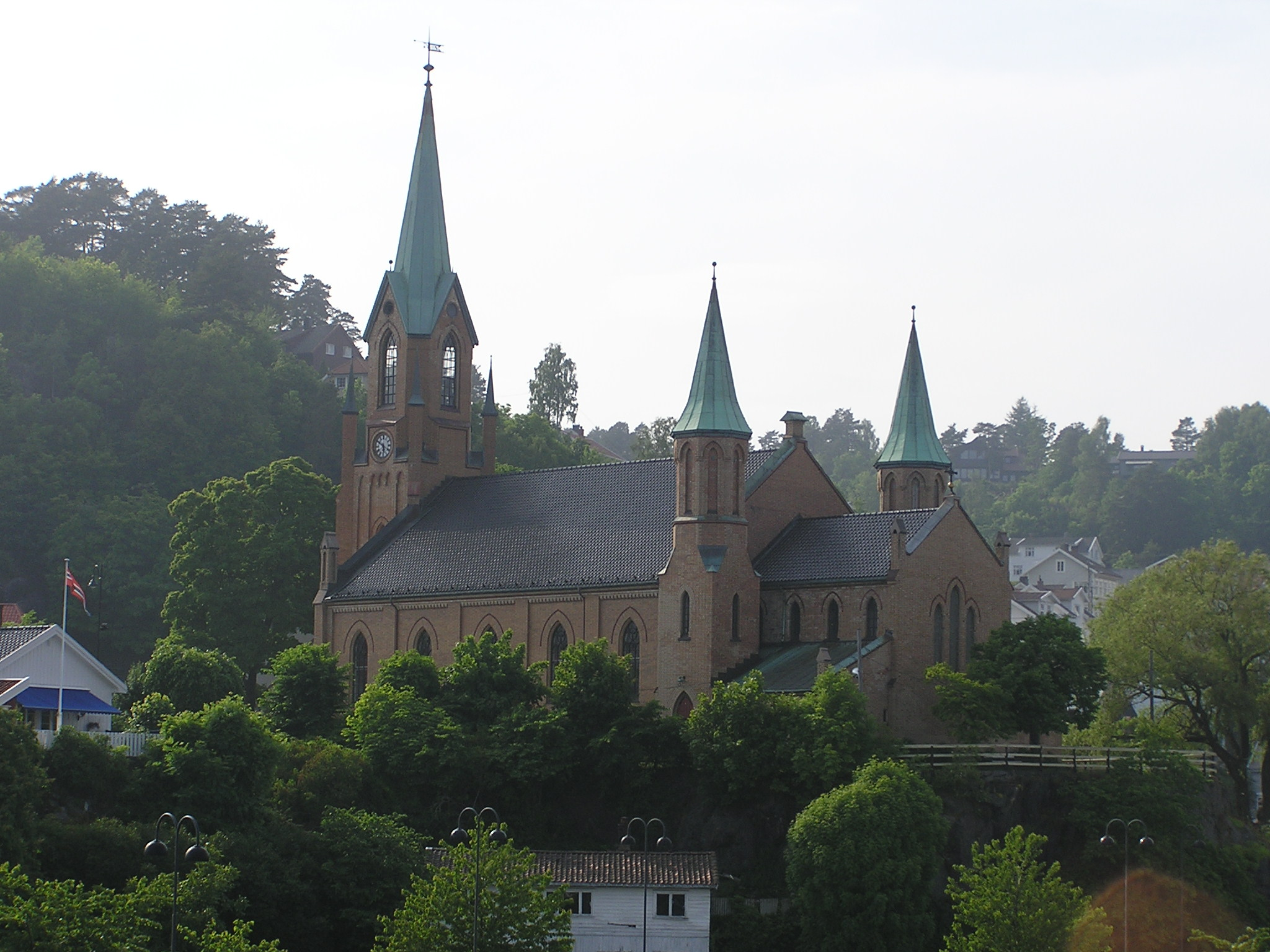
Kragerø Church

=== Administrative history ===
The formannskapsdistrikt law of 1837 created a system of local government in Norway by establishing each town (ladested or kjøpstad) and each Church of Norway prestegjeld as a civil municipality. On 1 January 1838, the kjøpstad of Kragerø was established as Kragerø Municipality. Since it had been a town since 1666, the small town was granted self-governing rights under this new law. Originally, Kragerø Municipality was an enclave and it was fully surrounded by Sannikedal Municipality.

On 1 January 1861, an area of Sannikedal Municipality (population: 857) that was adjacent to the growing town of Kragerø was annexed and transferred into Kragerø Municipality. On 1 January 1891, an area of Skaatø Municipality (population: 809) that was adjacent to the growing town of Kragerø was annexed and transferred into Kragerø Municipality.

During the 1960s, there were many municipal mergers across Norway due to the work of the Schei Committee. On 1 January 1960, the following areas were merged to form an enlarged Kragerø Municipality:

- all of Kragerø Municipality (population: 4,638)
- all of Sannidal Municipality (population: 2,604)
- all of Skåtøy Municipality (population: 3,208)

In 2020, there were many municipal and county mergers across Norway due to the work of the Solberg cabinet. Historically, this municipality was part of Telemark county. On 1 January 2020, the municipality became a part of the newly-formed Vestfold og Telemark county (after Telemark and Vestfold counties were merged). The merger was shortlived, and on 1 January 2024, the merger was undone and this municipality became part of Telemark county once again.

=== Name ===
The municipality (originally the town of Kragerø) is named after the island of Kragerø (Old Norse: Krákarey) since the town was built on the island and mainland near it. The first element is kráka which means "crow". The last element is ey which means "island". The Norwegian spelling would have a k instead of the g, but Kragerø uses the Danish form of the name, established in the 17th century.

=== Coat of arms ===
Kragerø received town privileges as a kjøpstad in 1666. Upon being granted this status, the town was given an obligation to provide a galley with five canons to the King for use in the Navy. From 1666 until 1842, Kragerø was dependent on the nearby town of Skien and had to pay taxes to Skien. Because of this, Kragerø used a seal which was identical to that of Skien depicting two skis, a cross, and flower decorations. After 1842, Kragerø began using a galley as its seal.

The coat of arms was granted on 28 January 1938 for the town of Kragerø and they were re-granted on 13 May 1960 after a municipal merger creating the present Kragerø Municipality. The official blazon is "Sable, a galley argent" (Norwegian: På svart bunn en sølv galei). This means the arms have a black field (background) and the charge is a galley. The galley has a tincture of argent which means it is commonly colored white, but if it is made out of metal, then silver is used. The arms were designed by Einar Foss after a sketch made by Olaf Lia. The municipal flag has the same design as the coat of arms.

=== Churches ===
The Church of Norway has five parishes (sokn) within Kragerø Municipality. It is part of the Bamble prosti (deanery) in the Diocese of Agder og Telemark.

Churches in Kragerø Municipality
Parish (sokn)	Church name	Location of the church	Year built
Helle	Helle Church	Helle	1981
Kragerø	Kragerø Church	Kragerø	1870
Levangsheia	Støle Church	Støle	1892
Sannidal	Sannidal Church	Kil	1772
Skåtøy	Skåtøy Church	Skåtøy	1862

== Geography ==
Kragerø Municipality is the southernmost municipality in Telemark county. To the southwest, it borders Risør Municipality (in Agder county); to the west is Gjerstad Municipality (also in Agder county); to the northwest is Drangedal Municipality; and to the northeast is Bamble Municipality. Kragerø Municipality is popular among Norwegians (as well as foreigners) as a vacation destination during the summer, when the population swells considerably.

The municipality includes 495 islands, islets, and skerries along with 4,000 leisure houses. There are also 190 freshwater lakes in the municipality. The main offshore islands include Tåtøy, Øya, Skåtøy, Langøy, Bærøy, Gumøy, Stråholmen, and Jomfruland. The Fossingfjord and Kilsfjord both are found in Kragerø. The large lake Toke is partially located in the northern part of KragerøThe highest point in the municipality is the 329.16-metre (1,079.9 ft) tall mountain Store Valefjell, located on the border with Drangedal Municipality..

=== Climate ===
The municipality of Kragerø lies in a transition zone between a humid continental and a temperate oceanic climate. The town of Kragerø, sees average temperatures from 0 °C (32 °F) to −1 °C (30 °F) in January and February, and about 17 °C (63 °F) during July. The maritime location of Jomfruland Lighthouse leads to a more temperate climate than found in the town of Kragerø.

Climate data for Jomfruland Lighthouse 1991-2020 (3 m, average high/low 2003-2025)
Month	Jan	Feb	Mar	Apr	May	Jun	Jul	Aug	Sep	Oct	Nov	Dec	Year
Mean daily maximum °C (°F)	2.8 (37.0)	2.7 (36.9)	5.7 (42.3)	10.1 (50.2)	14.7 (58.5)	18.8 (65.8)	20.8 (69.4)	19.9 (67.8)	16.7 (62.1)	11.6 (52.9)	7.3 (45.1)	4.2 (39.6)	11.3 (52.3)
Daily mean °C (°F)	0.6 (33.1)	0.2 (32.4)	2.3 (36.1)	6.1 (43.0)	10.9 (51.6)	14.8 (58.6)	17.3 (63.1)	17 (63)	13.6 (56.5)	8.8 (47.8)	4.8 (40.6)	1.7 (35.1)	8.2 (46.8)
Mean daily minimum °C (°F)	−1.5 (29.3)	−1.7 (28.9)	0.1 (32.2)	3.7 (38.7)	8.2 (46.8)	12.4 (54.3)	14.8 (58.6)	14.2 (57.6)	11.5 (52.7)	7 (45)	3.3 (37.9)	0 (32)	6.0 (42.8)
Source 1: NOAA – WMO averages 91-2020 Norway
Source 2: Seklima (avg highs/lows)

== Government ==
Kragerø Municipality is responsible for primary education (through 10th grade), outpatient health services, senior citizen services, welfare and other social services, zoning, economic development, and municipal roads and utilities. The municipality is governed by a municipal council of directly elected representatives. The mayor is indirectly elected by a vote of the municipal council. The municipality is under the jurisdiction of the Telemark District Court and the Agder Court of Appeal.

=== Municipal council ===
The municipal council (Kommunestyre) of Kragerø Municipality is made up of 35 representatives that are elected to four-year terms. The tables below show the current and historical composition of the council by political party.

Kragerø kommunestyre 2023–2027
Party name (in Norwegian)	Number of representatives
Labour Party (Arbeiderpartiet)	6
Progress Party (Fremskrittspartiet)	8
Green Party (Miljøpartiet De Grønne)	3
Conservative Party (Høyre)	5
Industry and Business Party (Industri‑ og Næringspartiet)	1
Christian Democratic Party (Kristelig Folkeparti)	1
Red Party (Rødt)	6
Centre Party (Senterpartiet)	3
Socialist Left Party (Sosialistisk Venstreparti)	1
Liberal Party (Venstre)	1
Total number of members:	35

Kragerø kommunestyre 2019–2023
Party name (in Norwegian)	Number of representatives
Labour Party (Arbeiderpartiet)	8
Progress Party (Fremskrittspartiet)	4
Green Party (Miljøpartiet De Grønne)	3
Conservative Party (Høyre)	5
Christian Democratic Party (Kristelig Folkeparti)	2
Red Party (Rødt)	4
Centre Party (Senterpartiet)	7
Socialist Left Party (Sosialistisk Venstreparti)	1
Liberal Party (Venstre)	1
Total number of members:	35

Kragerø kommunestyre 2015–2019
Party name (in Norwegian)	Number of representatives
Labour Party (Arbeiderpartiet)	13
Progress Party (Fremskrittspartiet)	5
Green Party (Miljøpartiet De Grønne)	1
Conservative Party (Høyre)	4
Christian Democratic Party (Kristelig Folkeparti)	2
Red Party (Rødt)	6
Centre Party (Senterpartiet)	1
Socialist Left Party (Sosialistisk Venstreparti)	1
Liberal Party (Venstre)	2
Total number of members:	35

Kragerø kommunestyre 2011–2015
Party name (in Norwegian)	Number of representatives
Labour Party (Arbeiderpartiet)	12
Progress Party (Fremskrittspartiet)	4
Conservative Party (Høyre)	10
Christian Democratic Party (Kristelig Folkeparti)	2
Red Party (Rødt)	3
Centre Party (Senterpartiet)	1
Socialist Left Party (Sosialistisk Venstreparti)	1
Liberal Party (Venstre)	2
Total number of members:	35

Kragerø kommunestyre 2007–2011
Party name (in Norwegian)	Number of representatives
Labour Party (Arbeiderpartiet)	10
Progress Party (Fremskrittspartiet)	6
Conservative Party (Høyre)	8
Christian Democratic Party (Kristelig Folkeparti)	2
Red Electoral Alliance (Rød Valgallianse)	2
Centre Party (Senterpartiet)	1
Socialist Left Party (Sosialistisk Venstreparti)	2
Liberal Party (Venstre)	4
Total number of members:	35

Kragerø kommunestyre 2003–2007
Party name (in Norwegian)	Number of representatives
Labour Party (Arbeiderpartiet)	12
Progress Party (Fremskrittspartiet)	5
Conservative Party (Høyre)	5
Christian Democratic Party (Kristelig Folkeparti)	3
Red Electoral Alliance (Rød Valgallianse)	2
Centre Party (Senterpartiet)	1
Socialist Left Party (Sosialistisk Venstreparti)	5
Liberal Party (Venstre)	2
Total number of members:	35

Kragerø kommunestyre 1999–2003
Party name (in Norwegian)	Number of representatives
Labour Party (Arbeiderpartiet)	10
Progress Party (Fremskrittspartiet)	4
Conservative Party (Høyre)	8
Christian Democratic Party (Kristelig Folkeparti)	5
Red Electoral Alliance (Rød Valgallianse)	3
Centre Party (Senterpartiet)	1
Socialist Left Party (Sosialistisk Venstreparti)	2
Liberal Party (Venstre)	2
Total number of members:	35

Kragerø kommunestyre 1995–1999
Party name (in Norwegian)	Number of representatives
Labour Party (Arbeiderpartiet)	15
Conservative Party (Høyre)	7
Christian Democratic Party (Kristelig Folkeparti)	5
Pensioners' Party (Pensjonistpartiet)	3
Red Electoral Alliance (Rød Valgallianse)	4
Centre Party (Senterpartiet)	4
Socialist Left Party (Sosialistisk Venstreparti)	3
Liberal Party (Venstre)	4
Total number of members:	45

Kragerø kommunestyre 1991–1995
Party name (in Norwegian)	Number of representatives
Labour Party (Arbeiderpartiet)	13
Progress Party (Fremskrittspartiet)	2
Conservative Party (Høyre)	6
Christian Democratic Party (Kristelig Folkeparti)	4
Pensioners' Party (Pensjonistpartiet)	5
Red Electoral Alliance (Rød Valgallianse)	1
Centre Party (Senterpartiet)	5
Socialist Left Party (Sosialistisk Venstreparti)	6
Liberal Party (Venstre)	3
Total number of members:	45

Kragerø kommunestyre 1987–1991
Party name (in Norwegian)	Number of representatives
Labour Party (Arbeiderpartiet)	20
Conservative Party (Høyre)	11
Christian Democratic Party (Kristelig Folkeparti)	5
Red Electoral Alliance (Rød Valgallianse)	1
Centre Party (Senterpartiet)	2
Socialist Left Party (Sosialistisk Venstreparti)	3
Liberal Party (Venstre)	3
Total number of members:	45

Kragerø kommunestyre 1983–1987
Party name (in Norwegian)	Number of representatives
Labour Party (Arbeiderpartiet)	21
Conservative Party (Høyre)	12
Christian Democratic Party (Kristelig Folkeparti)	5
Centre Party (Senterpartiet)	2
Socialist Left Party (Sosialistisk Venstreparti)	3
Liberal Party (Venstre)	2
Total number of members:	45

Kragerø kommunestyre 1979–1983
Party name (in Norwegian)	Number of representatives
Labour Party (Arbeiderpartiet)	19
Conservative Party (Høyre)	9
Christian Democratic Party (Kristelig Folkeparti)	7
New People's Party (Nye Folkepartiet)	1
Centre Party (Senterpartiet)	2
Socialist Left Party (Sosialistisk Venstreparti)	3
Liberal Party (Venstre)	4
Total number of members:	45

Kragerø kommunestyre 1975–1979
Party name (in Norwegian)	Number of representatives
Labour Party (Arbeiderpartiet)	16
Conservative Party (Høyre)	9
Christian Democratic Party (Kristelig Folkeparti)	8
New People's Party (Nye Folkepartiet)	2
Centre Party (Senterpartiet)	3
Socialist Left Party (Sosialistisk Venstreparti)	3
Liberal Party (Venstre)	4
Total number of members:	45

Kragerø kommunestyre 1971–1975
Party name (in Norwegian)	Number of representatives
Labour Party (Arbeiderpartiet)	20
Conservative Party (Høyre)	6
Christian Democratic Party (Kristelig Folkeparti)	5
Centre Party (Senterpartiet)	4
Socialist People's Party (Sosialistisk Folkeparti)	4
Liberal Party (Venstre)	6
Total number of members:	45

Kragerø kommunestyre 1967–1971
Party name (in Norwegian)	Number of representatives
Labour Party (Arbeiderpartiet)	20
Conservative Party (Høyre)	5
Christian Democratic Party (Kristelig Folkeparti)	5
Centre Party (Senterpartiet)	3
Socialist People's Party (Sosialistisk Folkeparti)	4
Liberal Party (Venstre)	8
Total number of members:	45

Kragerø kommunestyre 1963–1967
Party name (in Norwegian)	Number of representatives
Labour Party (Arbeiderpartiet)	23
Conservative Party (Høyre)	6
Christian Democratic Party (Kristelig Folkeparti)	5
Centre Party (Senterpartiet)	2
Socialist People's Party (Sosialistisk Folkeparti)	3
Liberal Party (Venstre)	6
Total number of members:	45

Kragerø kommunestyre 1959–1963
Party name (in Norwegian)	Number of representatives
Labour Party (Arbeiderpartiet)	27
Conservative Party (Høyre)	7
Christian Democratic Party (Kristelig Folkeparti)	7
Centre Party (Senterpartiet)	3
Liberal Party (Venstre)	9
Total number of members:	53
Note: On 1 January 1960, Sannidal Municipality and Skåtøy Municipality were merged into Kragerø Municipality.

Kragerø bystyre 1955–1959
Party name (in Norwegian)	Number of representatives
Labour Party (Arbeiderpartiet)	14
Conservative Party (Høyre)	6
Communist Party (Kommunistiske Parti)	1
Christian Democratic Party (Kristelig Folkeparti)	3
Liberal Party (Venstre)	3
Local List(s) (Lokale lister)	2
Total number of members:	29

Kragerø bystyre 1951–1955
Party name (in Norwegian)	Number of representatives
Labour Party (Arbeiderpartiet)	14
Conservative Party (Høyre)	6
Communist Party (Kommunistiske Parti)	1
Christian Democratic Party (Kristelig Folkeparti)	4
Liberal Party (Venstre)	2
Local List(s) (Lokale lister)	1
Total number of members:	28

Kragerø bystyre 1947–1951
Party name (in Norwegian)	Number of representatives
Labour Party (Arbeiderpartiet)	12
Conservative Party (Høyre)	6
Communist Party (Kommunistiske Parti)	1
Christian Democratic Party (Kristelig Folkeparti)	2
Liberal Party (Venstre)	5
Local List(s) (Lokale lister)	2
Total number of members:	28

Kragerø bystyre 1945–1947
Party name (in Norwegian)	Number of representatives
Labour Party (Arbeiderpartiet)	11
Conservative Party (Høyre)	5
Communist Party (Kommunistiske Parti)	4
Christian Democratic Party (Kristelig Folkeparti)	4
Joint list of the Liberal Party (Venstre) and the Radical People's Party (Radikale Folkepartiet)	4
Total number of members:	28

Kragerø bystyre 1937–1940*
Party name (in Norwegian)	Number of representatives
Labour Party (Arbeiderpartiet)	11
Liberal Party (Venstre)	7
Joint list of the Conservative Party (Høyre) and the Free-minded People's Party (Frisinnede Folkeparti)	8
Local List(s) (Lokale lister)	2
Total number of members:	28
Note: Due to the German occupation of Norway during World War II, no elections were held for new municipal councils until after the war ended in 1945.

Kragerø bystyre 1934–1937
Party name (in Norwegian)	Number of representatives
Labour Party (Arbeiderpartiet)	12
Free-minded People's Party (Frisinnede Folkeparti)	3
Conservative Party (Høyre)	7
Liberal Party (Venstre)	6
Total number of members:	28

Kragerø bystyre 1931–1934
Party name (in Norwegian)	Number of representatives
Labour Party (Arbeiderpartiet)	11
Free-minded People's Party (Frisinnede Folkeparti)	4
Conservative Party (Høyre)	8
Liberal Party (Venstre)	5
Total number of members:	28

Kragerø bystyre 1928–1931
Party name (in Norwegian)	Number of representatives
Labour Party (Arbeiderpartiet)	9
Joint list of the Liberal Party (Venstre) and Temperance Party (Avholdspartiet)	8
Joint list of the Conservative Party (Høyre) and the Free-minded Liberal Party (Frisinnede Venstre)	11
Total number of members:	28

Kragerø bystyre 1925–1928
Party name (in Norwegian)	Number of representatives
Labour Party (Arbeiderpartiet)	7
Temperance Party (Avholdspartiet)	4
Conservative Party (Høyre)	13
Liberal Party (Venstre)	4
Total number of members:	28

Kragerø bystyre 1922–1925
Party name (in Norwegian)	Number of representatives
Labour Party (Arbeiderpartiet)	9
Temperance Party (Avholdspartiet)	5
Liberal Party (Venstre)	3
Joint list of the Conservative Party (Høyre) and the Free-minded Liberal Party (Frisinnede Venstre)	11
Total number of members:	28

Kragerø bystyre 1919–1922
Party name (in Norwegian)	Number of representatives
Labour Party (Arbeiderpartiet)	5
Temperance Party (Avholdspartiet)	8
Conservative Party (Høyre)	9
Liberal Party (Venstre)	4
Local List(s) (Lokale lister)	2
Total number of members:	28

=== Mayors ===
The mayor (Norwegian: ordfører) of Kragerø Municipality is the political leader of the municipality and the chairperson of the municipal council. The following people have held this position:

- 1838–1842: Daniel Bremer Juell
- 1843–1843: Hans Kamstrup
- 1844–1844: Albert Biørn
- 1845–1846: Tellef Dahll Schweigaard
- 1847–1847: Folkman Freck
- 1848–1848: Hans Biørn Wenneberg
- 1849–1849: Hans Schaanning
- 1850–1850: L. Larsen
- 1851–1851: Hans Schaanning
- 1852–1852: L. Larsen
- 1853–1853: Thomas Doran
- 1854–1854: Lars Bastian Ridder Stabell
- 1855–1855: Thomes Thomesen
- 1856–1856: Hans Biørn Wenneberg
- 1857–1858: Christian Rømer
- 1859–1859: Peter Bredsdorff
- 1860–1860: Hans Doran
- 1861–1862: Halvor Andreas Bentsen
- 1863–1863: Christian Homann
- 1864–1864: Thomes Thomesen
- 1865–1866: Lauritz Bentzon Thrap
- 1867–1867: Halvor Andreas Bentsen
- 1868–1868: Thomas Møller Wiborg
- 1869–1869: Christian Homann
- 1870–1870: Halvor Andreas Bentsen
- 1871–1871: Christian Homann
- 1872–1872: Peter Bredsdorff
- 1873–1874: Johan Dahll
- 1875–1875: Christian Rømer
- 1876–1876: Halvor Andreas Bentsen
- 1877–1878: Anton Larsen-Naur (H)
- 1879–1880: Fredrik J. Mürer
- 1881–1884: Anders Daae
- 1885–1885: Anton Larsen-Naur (H)
- 1886–1886: Nils August Synnestvedt
- 1887–1887: Christian Gierløff (H)
- 1888–1888: Jacob Aalborg
- 1889–1890: Anton Larsen-Naur (H)
- 1891–1891: Nils Christian Stockfleth Aall
- 1892–1894: Søren Anton Wenneberg
- 1895–1900: Carl Bundi (V)
- 1901–1905: Ambortius Lindvig (V)
- 1906–1907: Nicolay Wiborg (SmP)
- 1908–1910: Godske Nielsen (H)
- 1911–1913: Hartvig Johnsen (AvH)
- 1914–1915: Knud Emanuel Olsen
- 1916–1916: Nicolay Wiborg (FV)
- 1917–1919: Rolf Svendsen (AvH)
- 1920–1920: Hartvig Johnsen (AvH)
- 1921–1921: Christen Eriksen Berg (V)
- 1922–1922: Einar Juell (H)
- 1923–1925: Anders Jørgensen (AvH)
- 1926–1932: Anders Eide (H)
- 1933–1934: Thorvald Naper (H)
- 1935–1937: Tor Kivle (Ap)
- 1938–1940: Daniel Bull (H)
- 1941–1941: Henry Karlsen (NS)
- 1941–1943: A.E. Abrahamsen (NS)
- 1943–1944: L.P. Thoresen (NS)
- 1944–1945: Olav Kvaalen (NS)
- 1945–1945: Daniel Bull (H)
- 1946–1946: Petter Bentsen (Ap)
- 1946–1957: Thorbjørn Nilsen (Ap)
- 1957–1959: Reidar Soløy (Ap)
- 1960–1963: Arne Midgaard (Ap)
- 1964–1975: Thorleif Knutsen (Ap)
- 1976–1981: Einar Barland (KrF)
- 1982–1983: Per Espeli (H)
- 1984–1999: Magnar Kalseth (Ap)
- 1999–2003: Kari Fosso (H)
- 2003–2007: Erling Laland (Ap)
- 2007–2015: Kåre Preben Hegland (H)
- 2015–2019: Jone Blikra (Ap)
- 2019–2023: Grunde Wegar Knudsen (Sp)
- 2023-present: Charlotte Therkelsen (R)

== Notable people ==
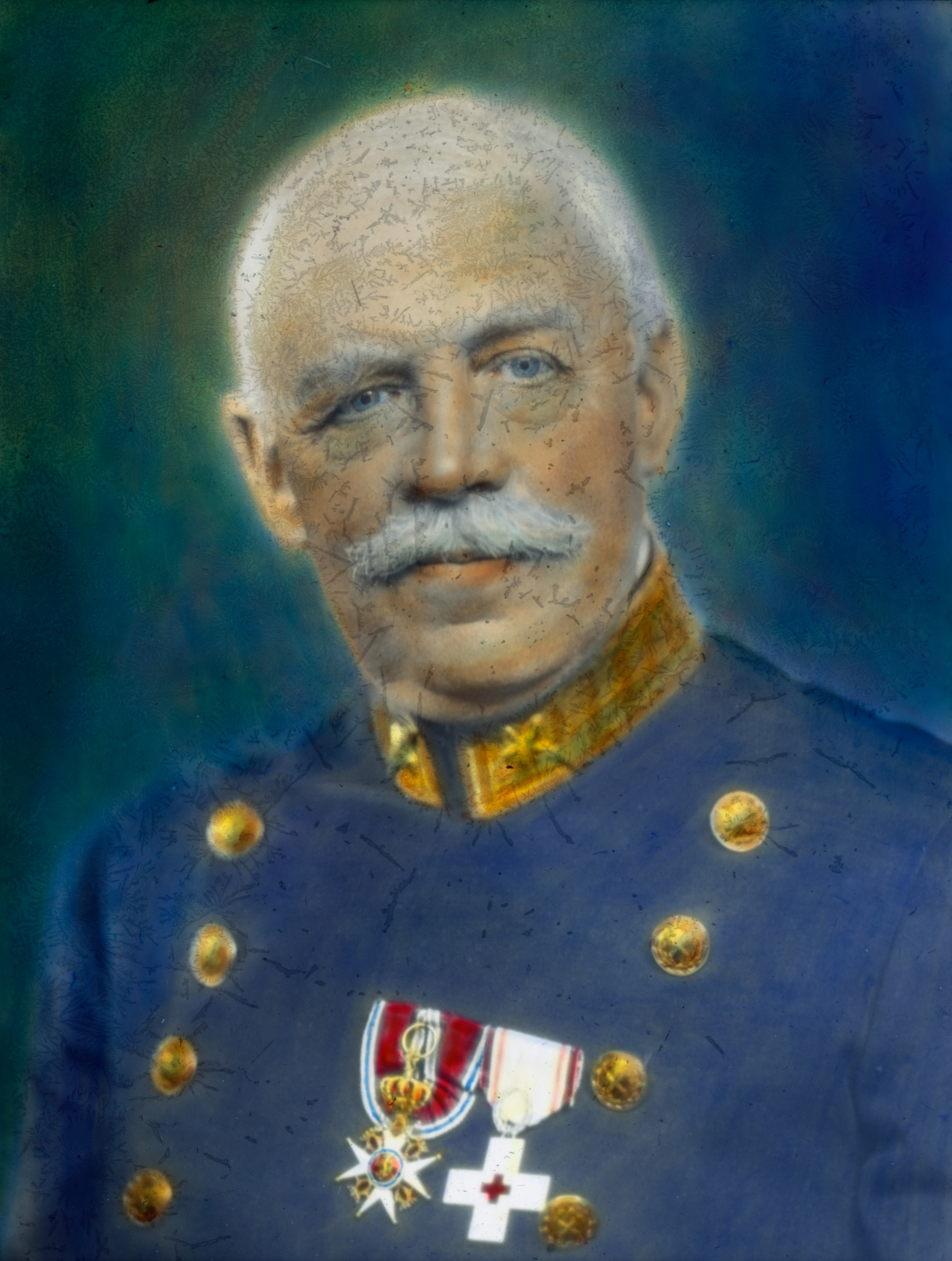
Hans Daae

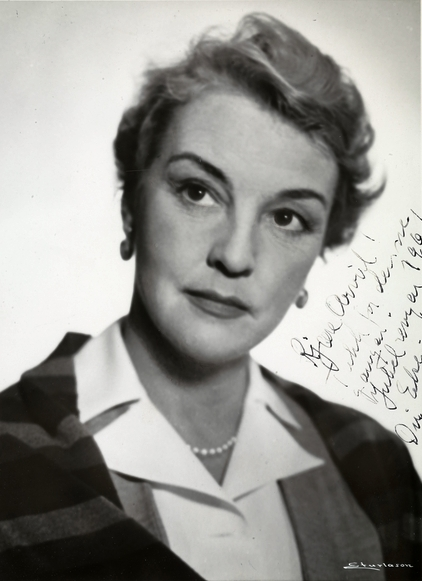
Else Heiberg, 1961

- Anton Martin Schweigaard (1808–1870), a jurist and economic reformer
- Henriette Homann (1819–1892), a photographer and painter.
- Nels Anderson (born 1828), a member of the Wisconsin State Assembly
- Johan Christian Heuch (1838–1904), a Bishop of the Diocese of Agder
- Theodor Kittelsen (1857–1914), a painter who also illustrated fairy tales, legends, and trolls
- Hans Daae (1865–1926), a physician, military officer and sports official
- Johan Søhr (1867–1949), a jurist and police officer
- Thomas Krag (1868–1913), a novelist, playwright and writer of short stories
- Samson Eitrem (1872–1966), a philologist, expert in ancient literature, religion and magic
- Edvard Amundsen (1873–1928), a Lutheran missionary in China and Tibet and an explorer
- Inge Debes (1882–1945), a jurist, editor, and politician
- Ronald Fangen (1895–1946), a novelist, playwright, psalmist, journalist, and literary critic
- Eugen Skjønberg (1889–1971), an actor
- Kirsten Heiberg (1907–1976), a Norwegian/German actress and singer
- Else Heiberg (1910–1972), an actress
- Ole Myrvoll (1911–1988), a professor of economics, liberal politician, and Minister of Finance
- Carsten Hopstock (1924–2014), an art historian who was the curator of Norwegian Museum of Cultural History
- Alf Cranner (1936–2020), a folk singer, lyricist and painter who lived in Kragerø from the 1960s
- Robert Mood (born 1958), a Major General and Head of the United Nations Supervision Mission in Syria (UNSMIS)

=== Sport ===
- Olaf Ørvig (1889–1939), a sailor and team gold medalist at the 1920 Summer Olympics
- Knut Lundstrøm (born 1951), an athlete and winter paralympian
- Geir Borgan Paulsen (born 1957), an IFBB Pro bodybuilder
- Preben Fjære Brynemo (born 1977), a Nordic combined skier who competed at the 2002 Winter Olympics

== International relations ==
=== Twin towns — Sister cities ===
Kragerø has sister city agreements with the following places:

- Mariehamn, Åland, Finland
- Slagelse, Region Sjælland, Denmark
- Valkeakoski, Western Finland, Finland
- Visby, Gotland County, Sweden
