= Skåtøy (disambiguation) =

Skåtøy may refer to:

== Places ==
- Skåtøy, an island in Kragerø Municipality in Telemark county, Norway
- Skåtøy Municipality, a former municipality in Telemark county, Norway
- Skåtøy Church, a church in Kragerø Municipality in Telemark county, Norway
- Skåtøy prestegjeld, a former geographic subdivision of the Church of Norway in Telemark county, Norway
