= Haavardsholm =

Haavardsholm is a surname. Notable people with the surname include:

- Espen Haavardsholm (born 1945), Norwegian novelist, poet, biographer and essayist
- Frøydis Haavardsholm (1896–1984), Norwegian visual artist and book illustrator
- Ole Haavardsholm (born 1989), Norwegian cyclist
