= Alexis de Chateauneuf =

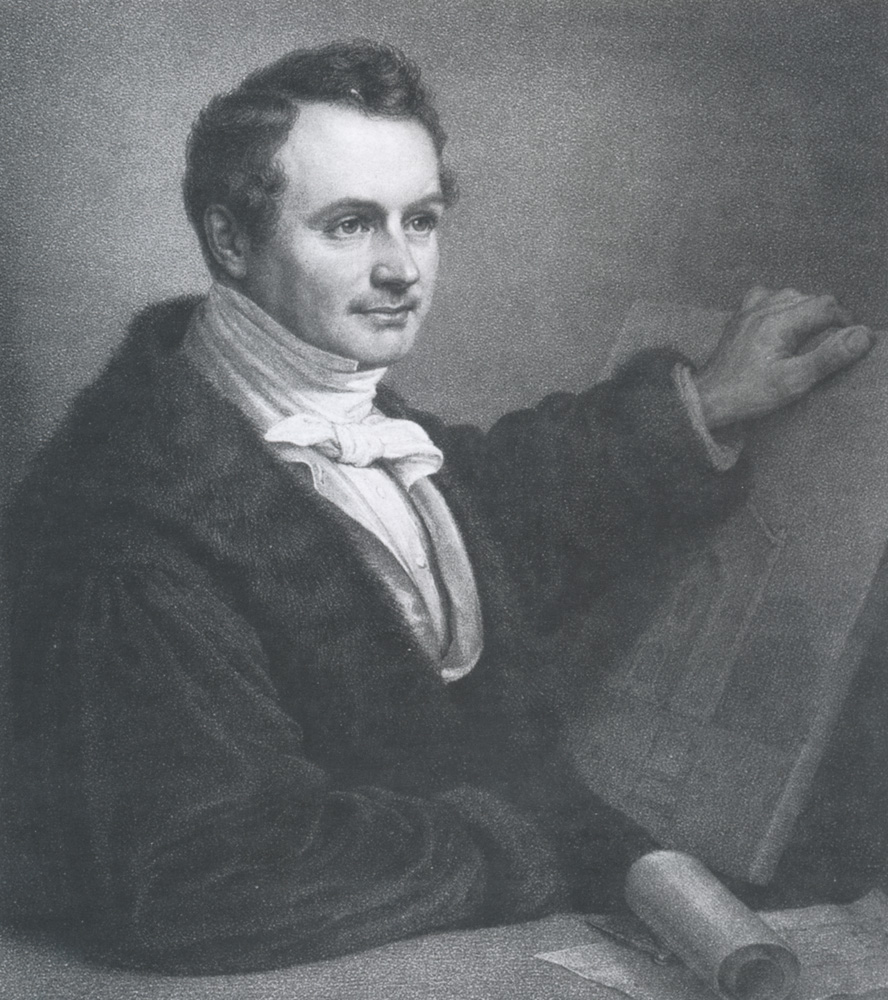
- Born: 18 February 1799; Hamburg
- Died: 31 December 1853 (aged 54); Hamburg
- Occupation: architect

Alexis de Chateauneuf (1799–1853) was a German architect and city planner from Hamburg.

== Biography ==
Chateauneuf was a son of French emigrants. He was educated in Hamburg, Paris and Karlsruhe, as well as a short stay at Karl Friedrich Schinkel in Berlin. Chateauneuf played a particularly prominent role during the reconstruction of Hamburg after the city fire in 1842. He also worked in London (1839-1840) and Christiania (Oslo) (1847-1850).

Alexis de Chateauneuf is considered one of the pioneers in the renovation of brick architecture in Hamburg. Several of the buildings he constructed in Hamburg had exposed bricks in the façades, which was publicly discussed. At this time it was common for brick to be covered with gypsum or cement. He made proposals for changes to existing buildings, new buildings and was active in a number of architectural competitions. Many of his proposals were completed. In the district of Neustadt in Hamburg, became a remarkable residential building completed after his drawings. He then received several assignments for both private individuals and for public buildings. He participated in several architectural competitions on stock exchange buildings, first the Hamburg Stock Exchange, later London Stock Exchange (1840). He did not win any of these competitions, but took second place in the architectural competition on the London Stock Exchange.

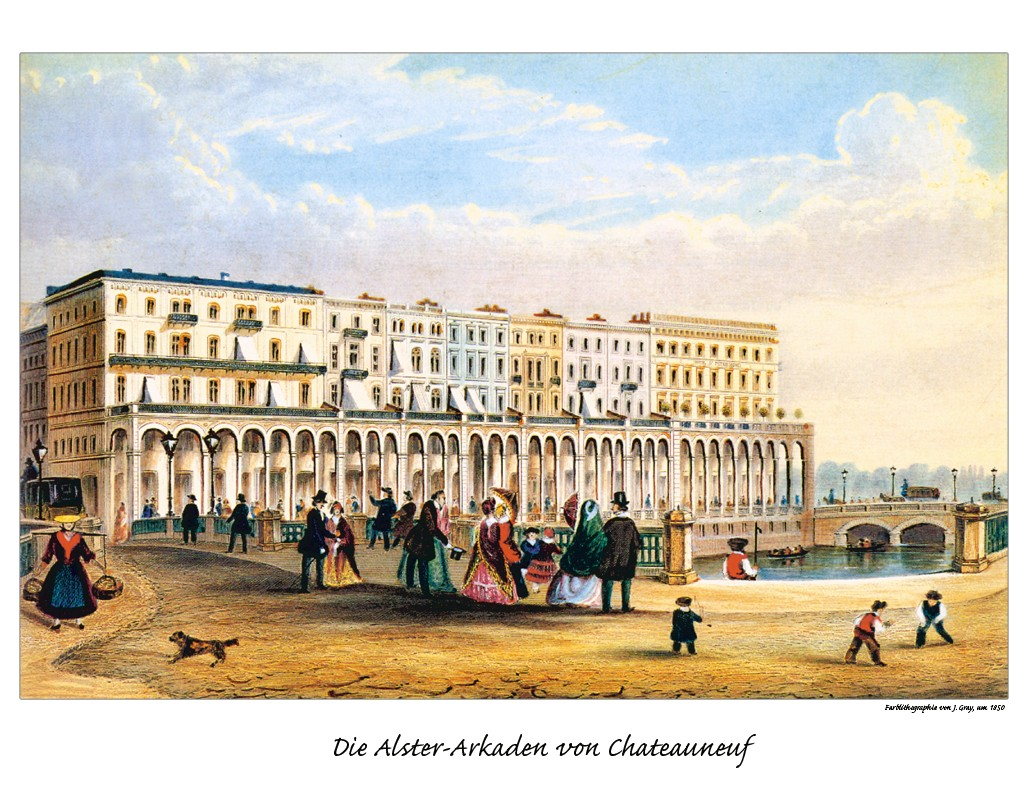
Alsterarkaden, a building complex in Hamburg, designed by Alexis de Chateauneuf (1843)

After the Great fire of Hamburg in 1842, he created several buildings, such as the Alsterarkaden building complex and St Peter's Church in Hamburg. He also contributed to the urban planning in general, and 1842-1847 he was chairman of the technical commission appointed to draw up plans for rebuilding the city.

Alexis de Chateauneuf married Caspara Møller from the then Christiania, Norway in 1846. In connection with a family visit in the city, he presented the drafts that led to the rebuilding of Vår Frelser's church - now the Oslo Cathedral. Chateauneuf delivered his own draft and the cathedral was reconstructed after this. Heinrich Ernst Schirmer was employed as a construction manager and Chateauneuf signed a contract.

At the same time, the authorities had initiated the planning of a new church in the city, which would be the Trinity Church (Oslo). Chateauneuf won the architectural competition. However, he died in 1853 before the cathedral was finished and his former student, Wilhelm von Hanno, completed the project.
