= Carl von Hanno =

Norwegian painter (1901–1953)

Carl von Hanno (24 November 1901 – 13 February 1953) was a Norwegian painter. His early style was influenced by cubism, and politically motivated. He later developed a personal, colourful style, often portraying seascapes.

== Biography ==
He was born in Kristiania (now Oslo), Norway. He was a grandson of architect, sculptor and painter Wilhelm von Hanno (1826-1882). His grandfather had operated a drawing school in Kristiania which was later operated his father Albert Oscar von Hanno (1862-1938). He was a student at the Norwegian National Academy of Craft and Art Industry in 1920 and at the Norwegian National Academy of Fine Arts 1920–22. He spent a couple of semesters at the painting school of Pola Gauguin (1883–1961) from 1923. His first solo exhibition was at Blomqvist Kunsthandel in 1924. Throughout his artistic career, von Hanno worked as an educator. Carl von Hanno was head teacher at the Oslo School of Architecture and Design 1937–51.
