= Trinity Church (Oslo) =

- Trefoldighetskirken
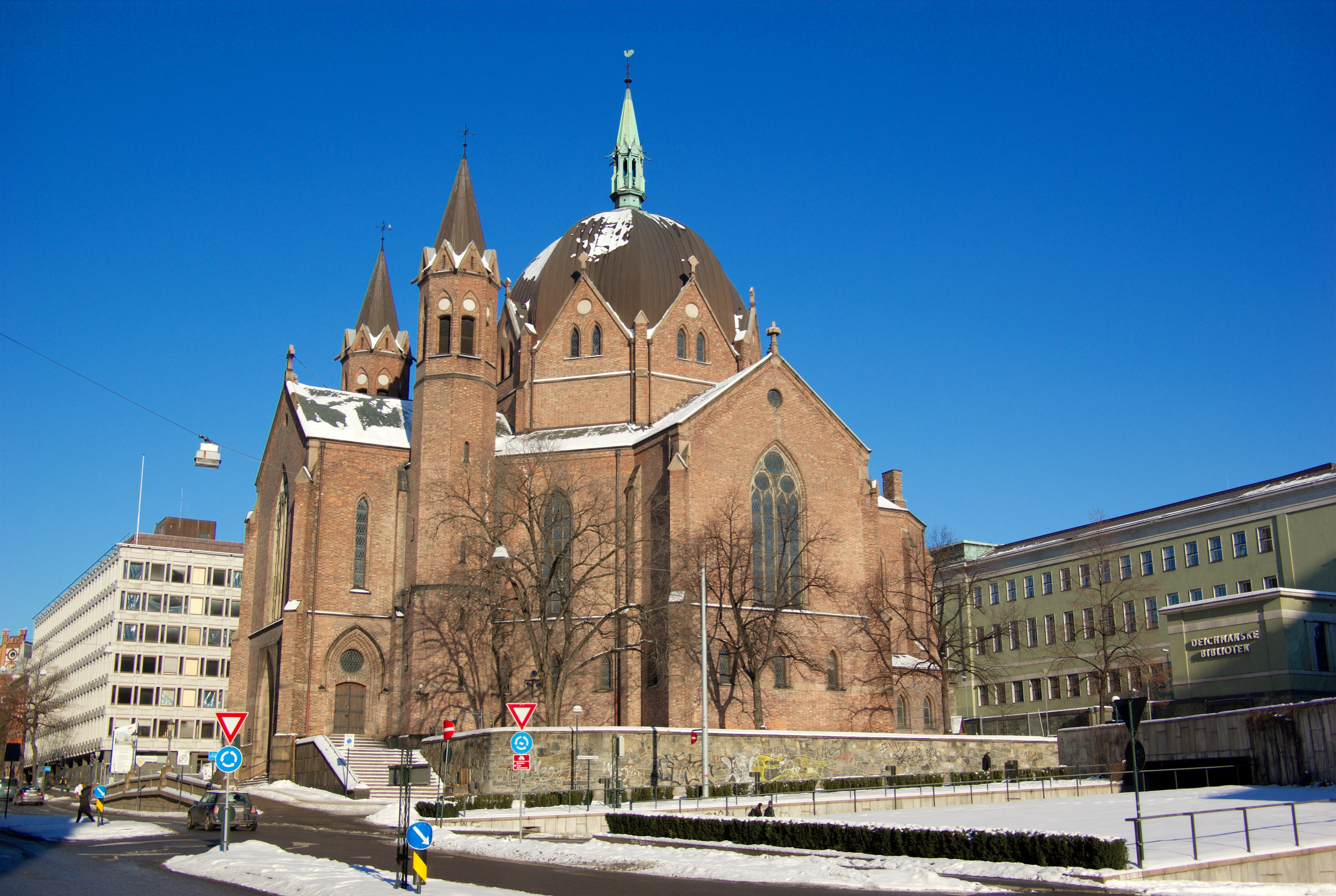

- Location within Oslo Location within Norway
- 59°54′59.57″N 10°44′42.83″E
- Location: Akersgata 60, Oslo,
- Country: Norway
- Denomination: Church of Norway
- Churchmanship: Evangelical Lutheran
- Website: https://kirken.no/nb-NO/fellesrad/kirkeneioslo

History
- Status: Parish church
- Consecrated: 1858

Architecture
- Functional status: Active
- Architect(s): Alexis de Chateauneuf, Wilhelm von Hanno
- Style: Neo Gothic

Specifications
- Materials: Brick

Administration
- Diocese: Diocese of Oslo
- Parish: Trefoldighet (Trinity)

Trinity Church (in Norwegian, Trefoldighetskirken), is a church in the Hammersborg neighborhood in central Oslo, Norway. Trinity Church is neighbor of the government buildings in Regjeringskvartalet. It is the parish church of the parish of Trinity, belonging to the Diocese of Oslo of the Church of Norway. It is one of the largest churches in Oslo (1000 seats). The church itself is in raw red brick, while the vaults, arches and small columns have gray scale color. The nave is octagonal with a Greek cross superimposed, with the choir in the apse, shallow transept and rectangular entrance flanked by two slender, octagonal bell towers. A central dome rises above the church. Trinity Church is the largest church in Oslo and one of the largest of the many octagonal churches in Norway, but one of few octagonal churches constructed in red brick.

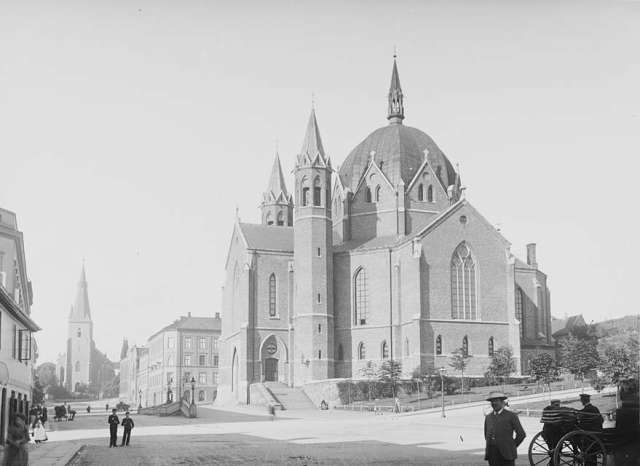
Trinity Church in 1890. St. Olav's Cathedral (Roman Catholic) in the background

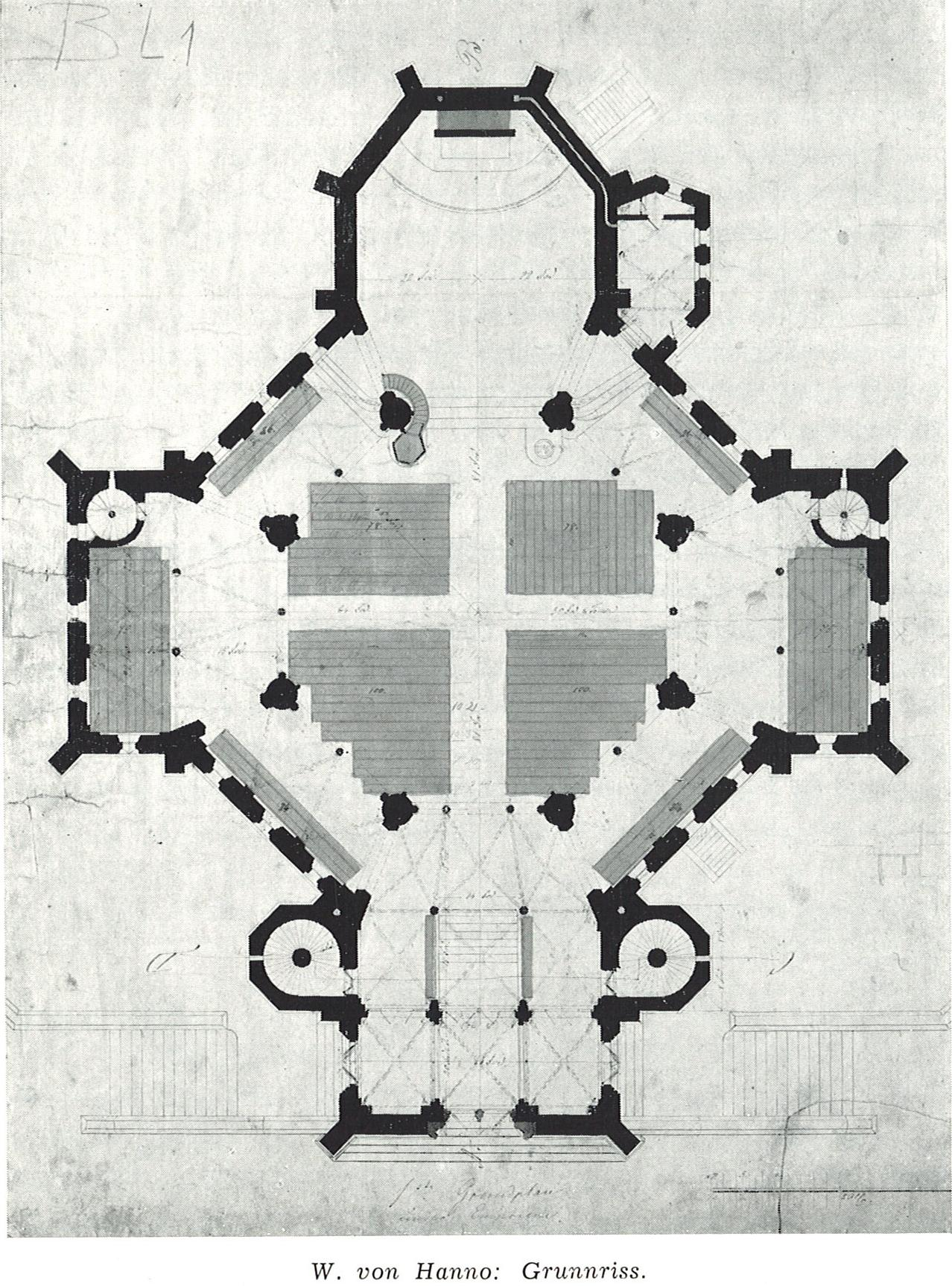
Wilhelm von Hannos combined octagonal-cruciform floorplan.

== History ==
Trinity Church was consecrated in 1858 by Bishop Jens Lauritz Arup. The church has a neo-Gothic central plan, with two towers and eight-sided dome, and was designed by architect Alexis de Chateauneuf (Hamburg, Germany), but some time after the work was entrusted to his pupil Wilhelm von Hanno, who made some modifications to the original plans and put his personal stamp on the details of interior decoration. The main body (1872) is the work of Claus Jensen, the altarpiece (1866) is a painting by Adolph Tidemand (the Baptism of Jesus), chandeliers were designed by Emanuel Vigeland in 1923, and Frøydis Haavardsholm was the designer of the stained glass windows.

== See also ==
- Octagonal churches in Norway

== Gallery: Interior ==
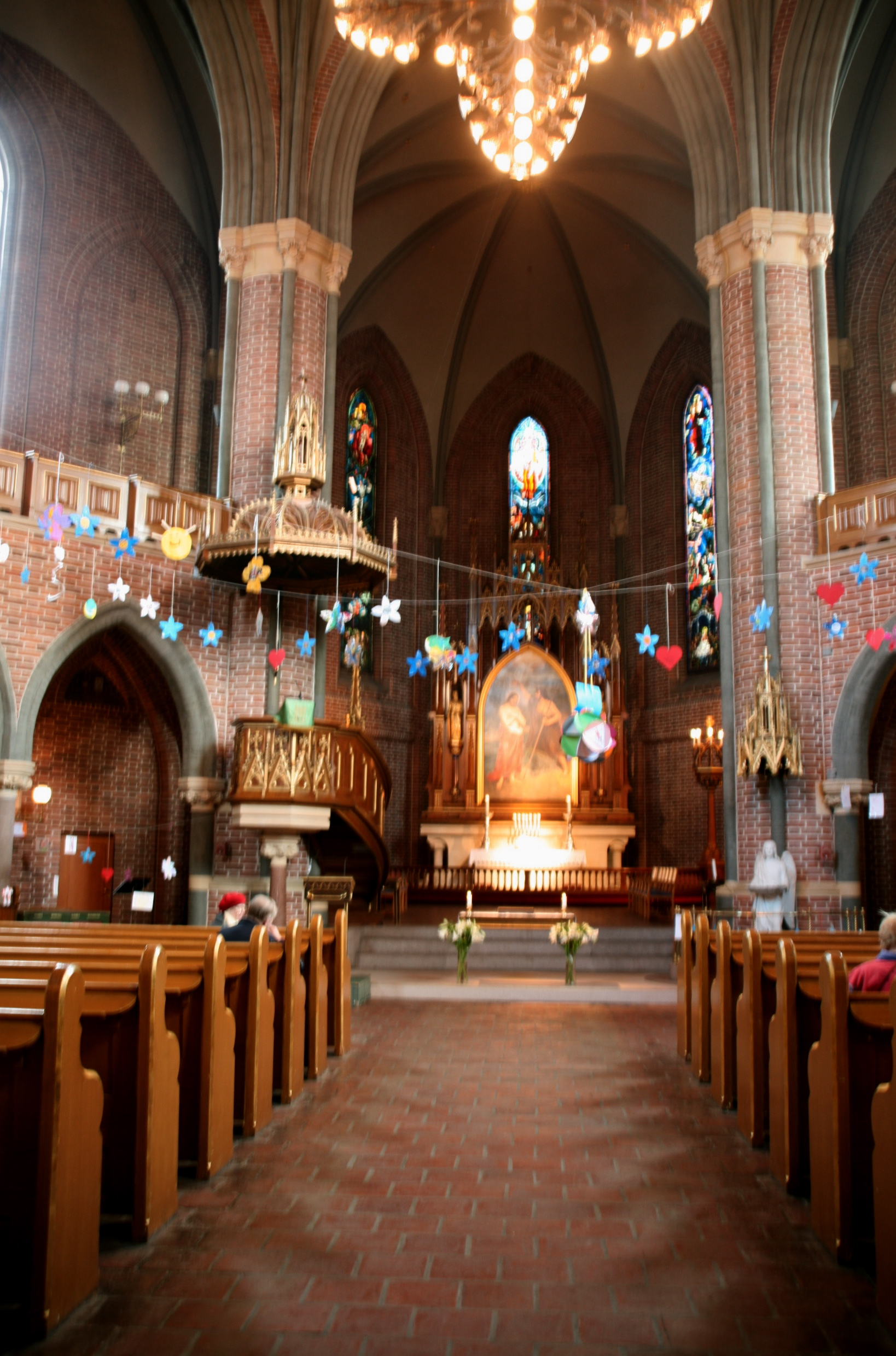
Interior

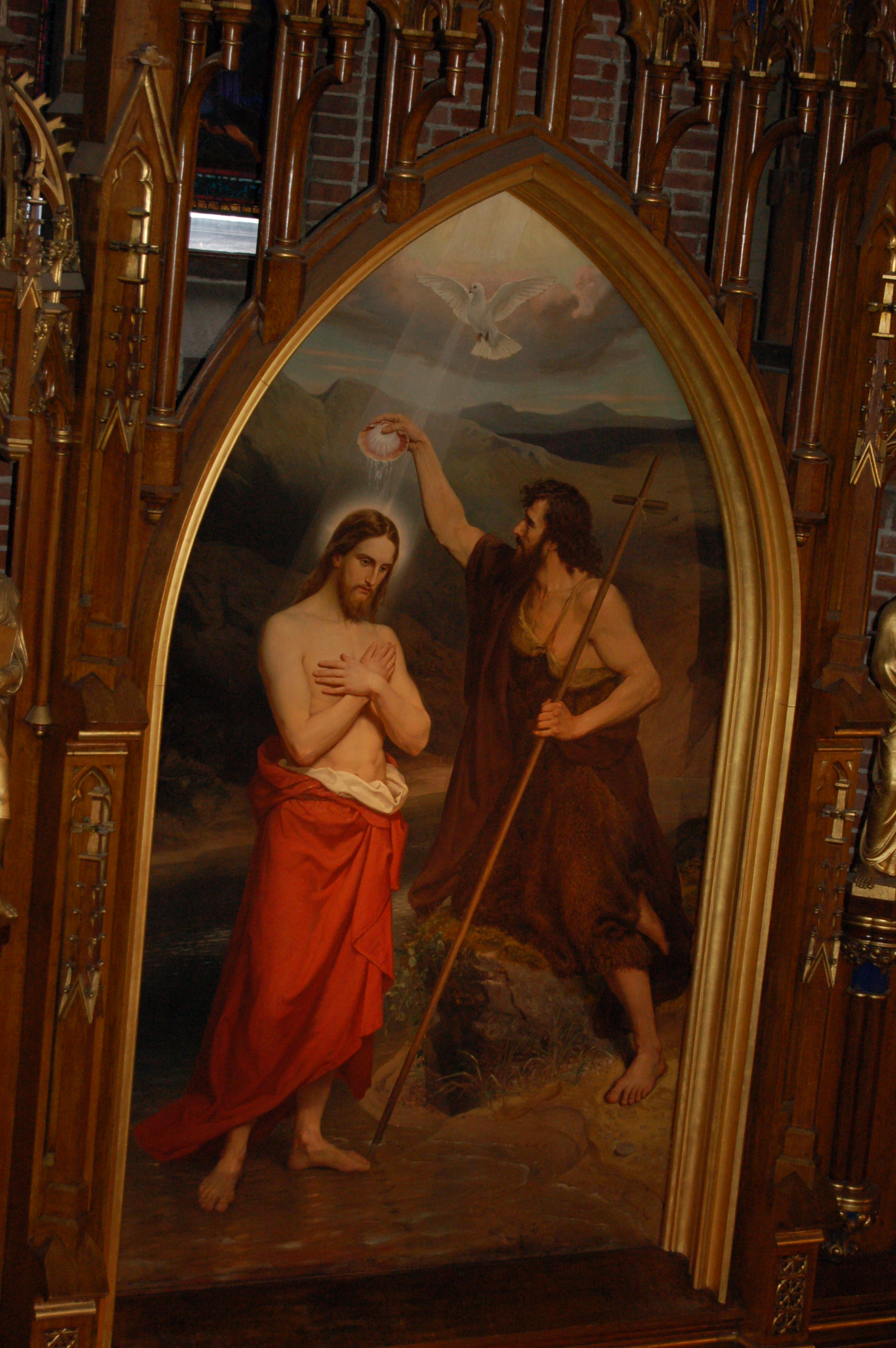
The altarpiece by Adolph Tidemand

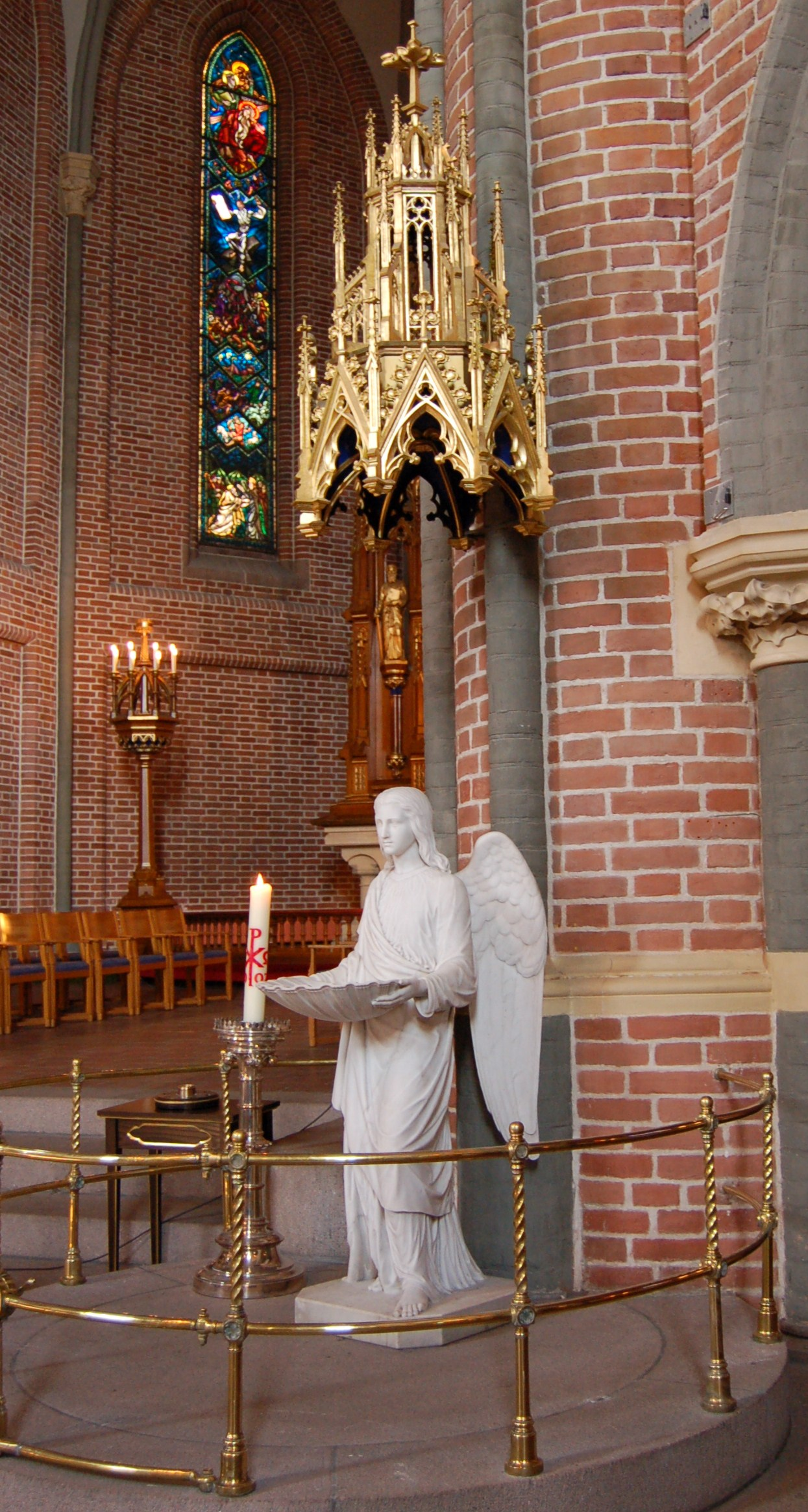
Baptismal font

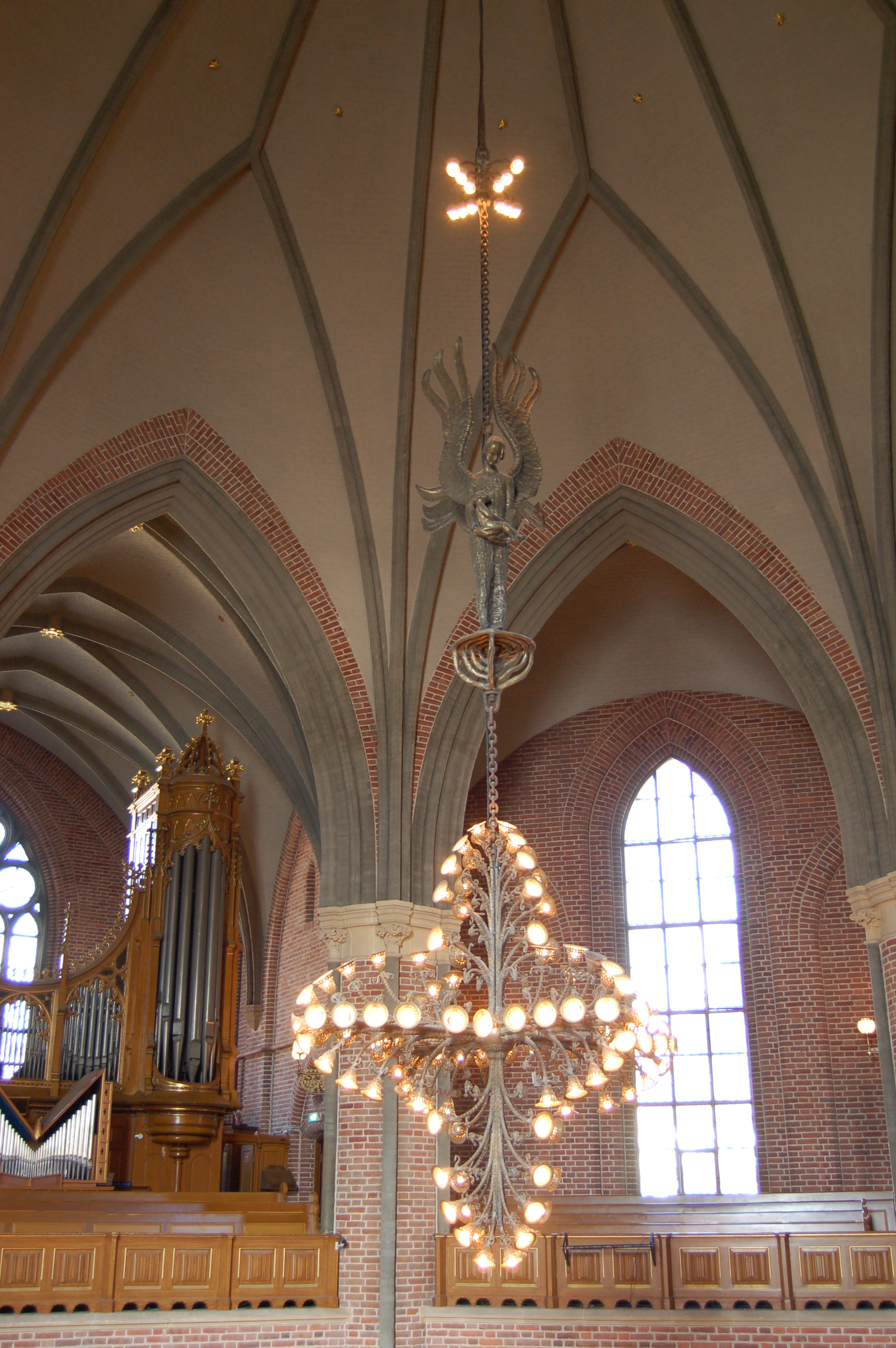
The chandelier in Trinity Church. Created by Emanuel Vigeland

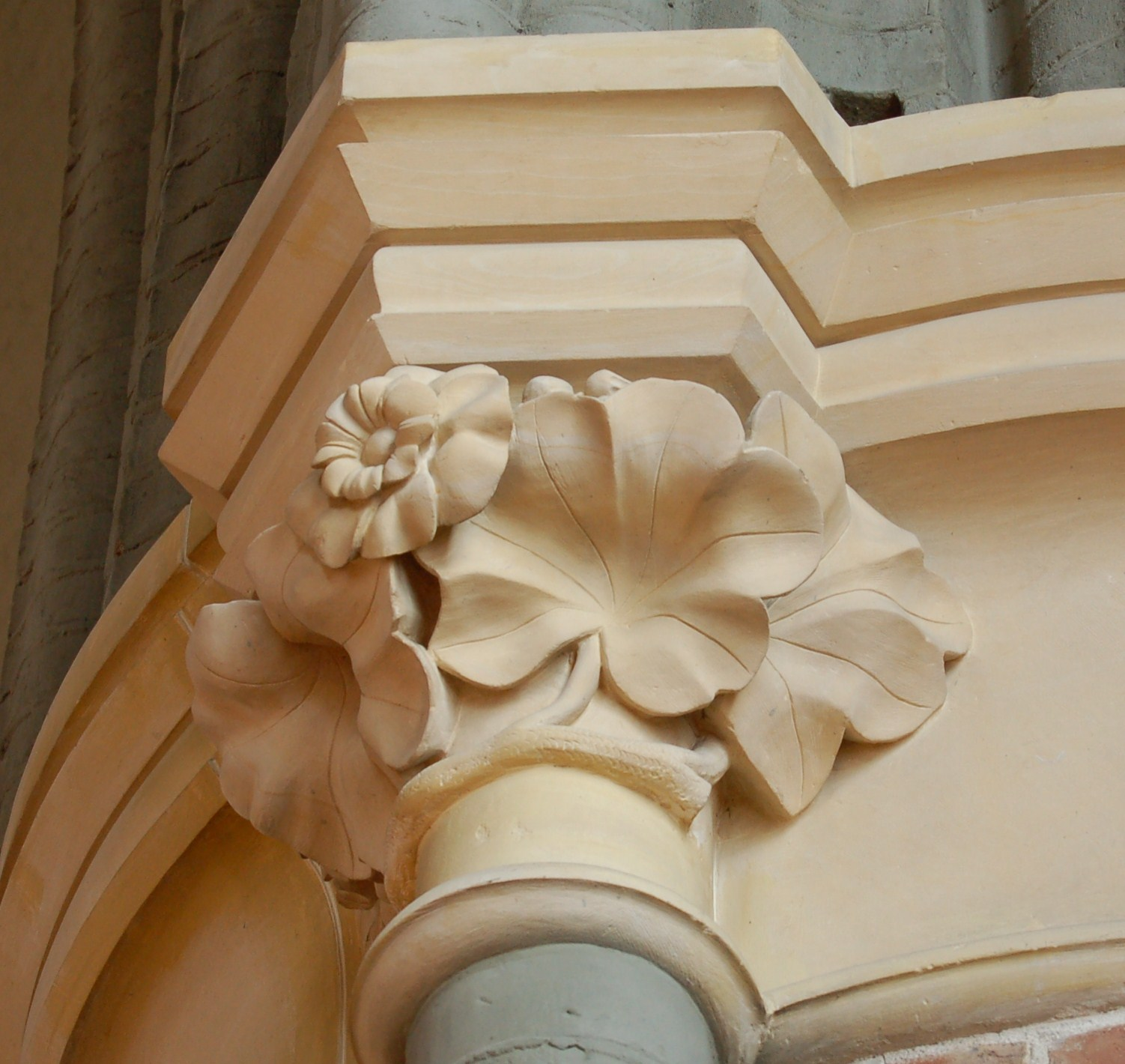
Detail of a capital (architecture)

== Gallery: Stained glass ==
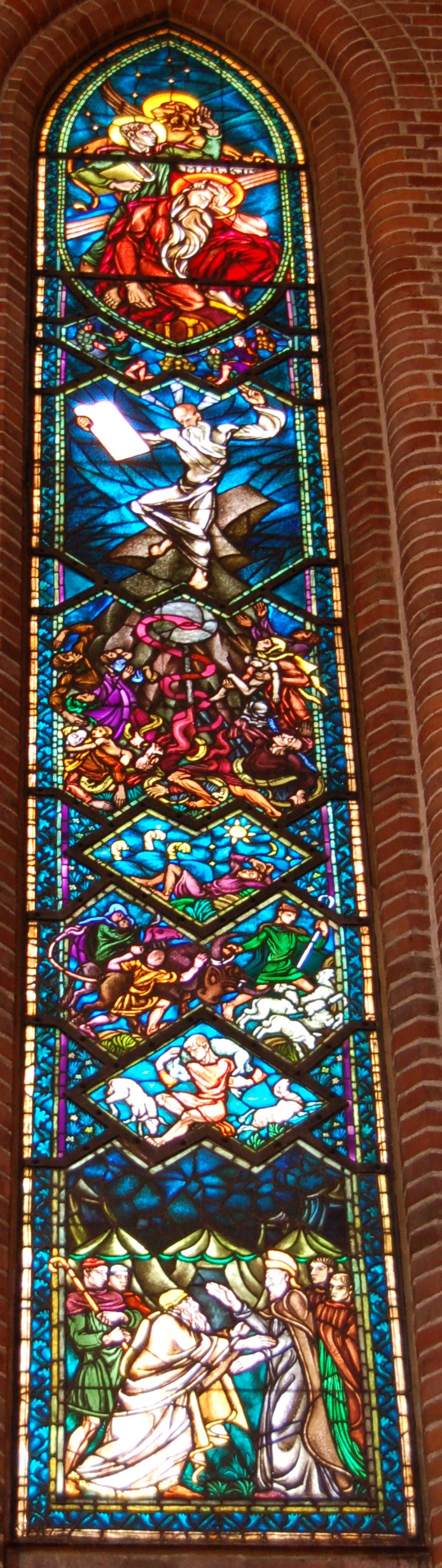
"The history of Israel"

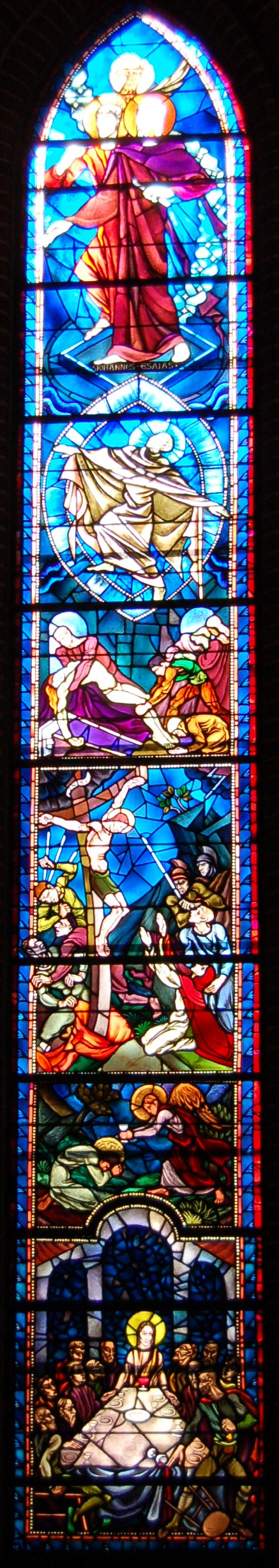
"Jesus suffering"

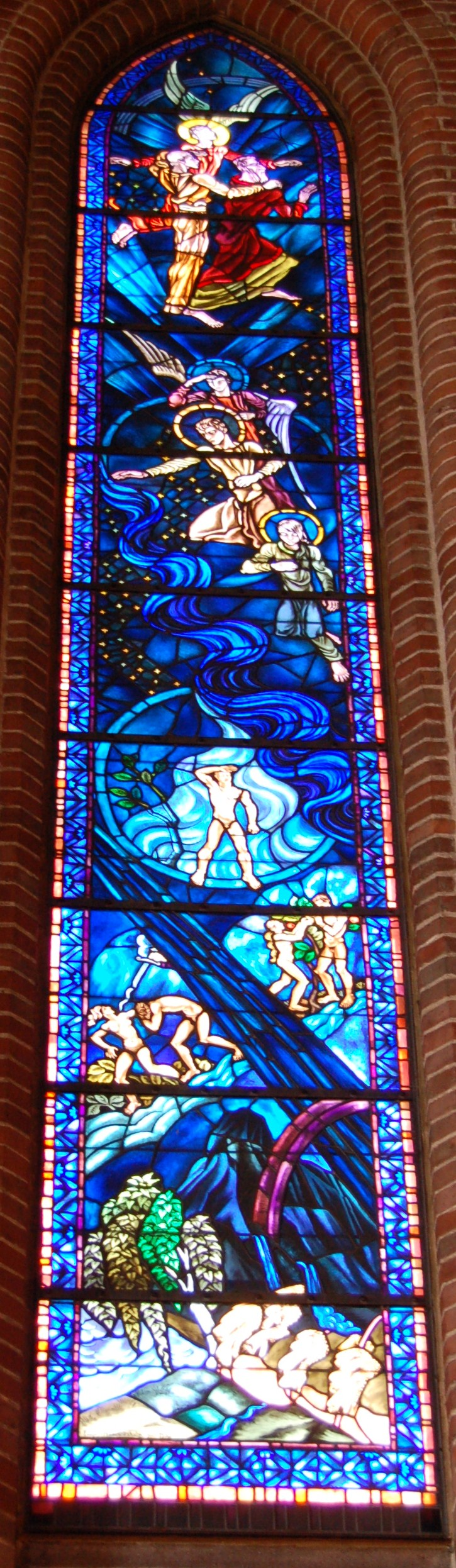
"The creation"

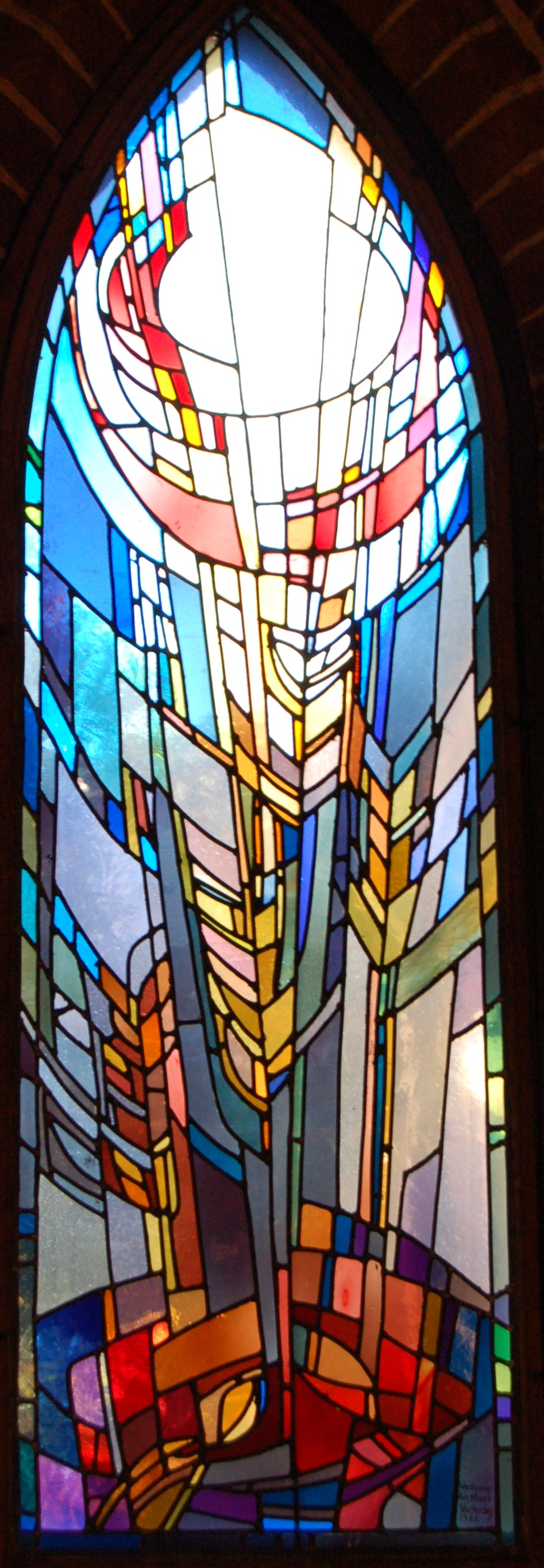
"The wheat grain"

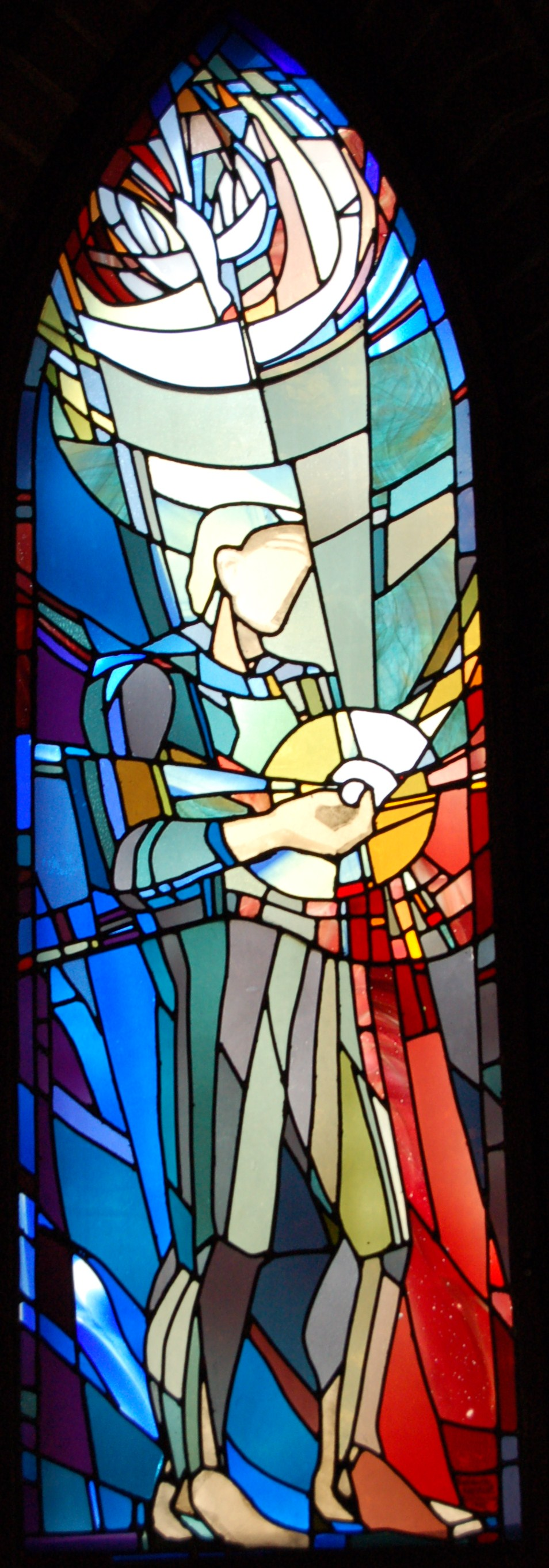
"The pearl"

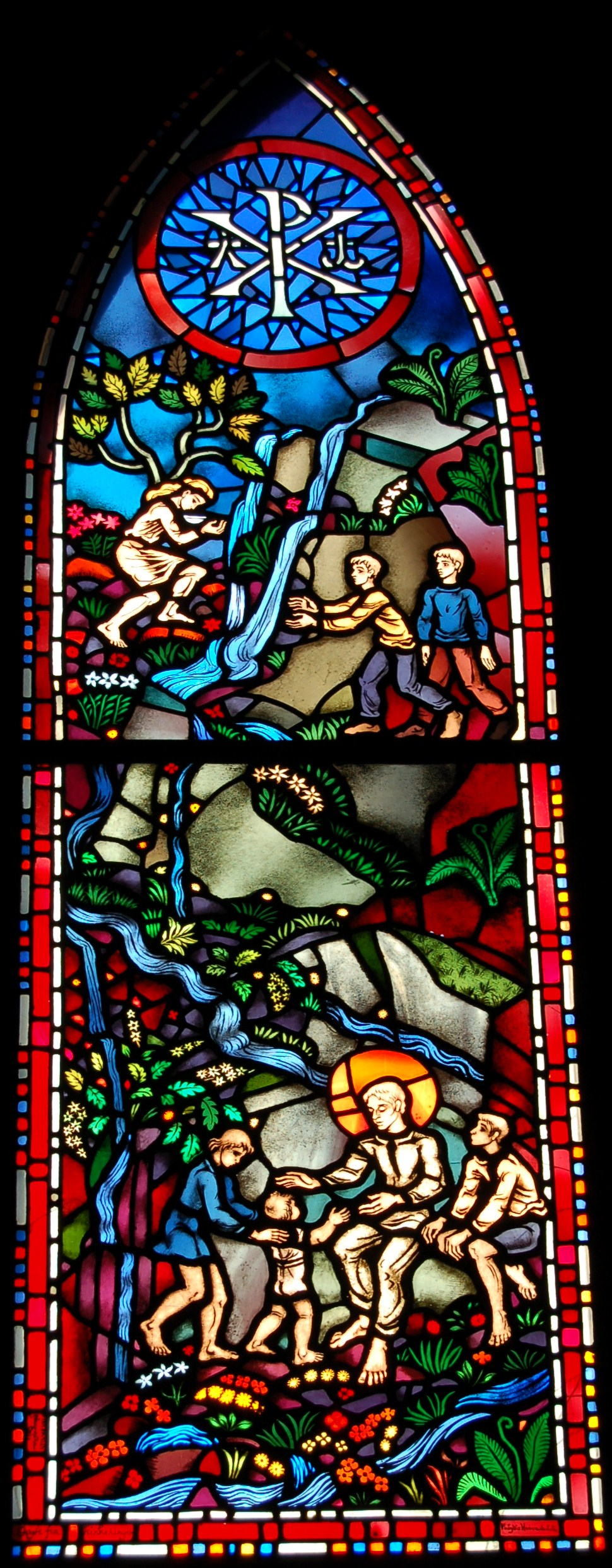
"The water of life"

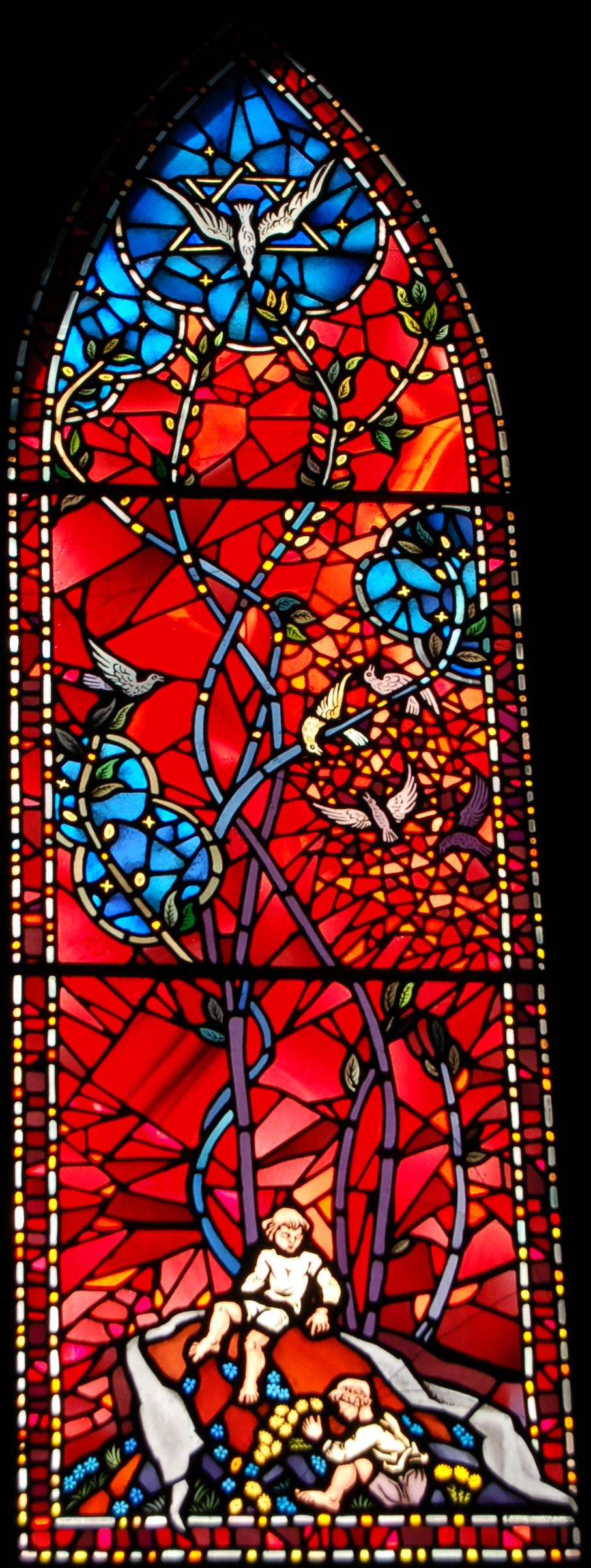
"The tree of life"
