= Nordstrand Church =

Coordinates: 59°51′33″N 10°48′10″E

- Nordstrand kirke
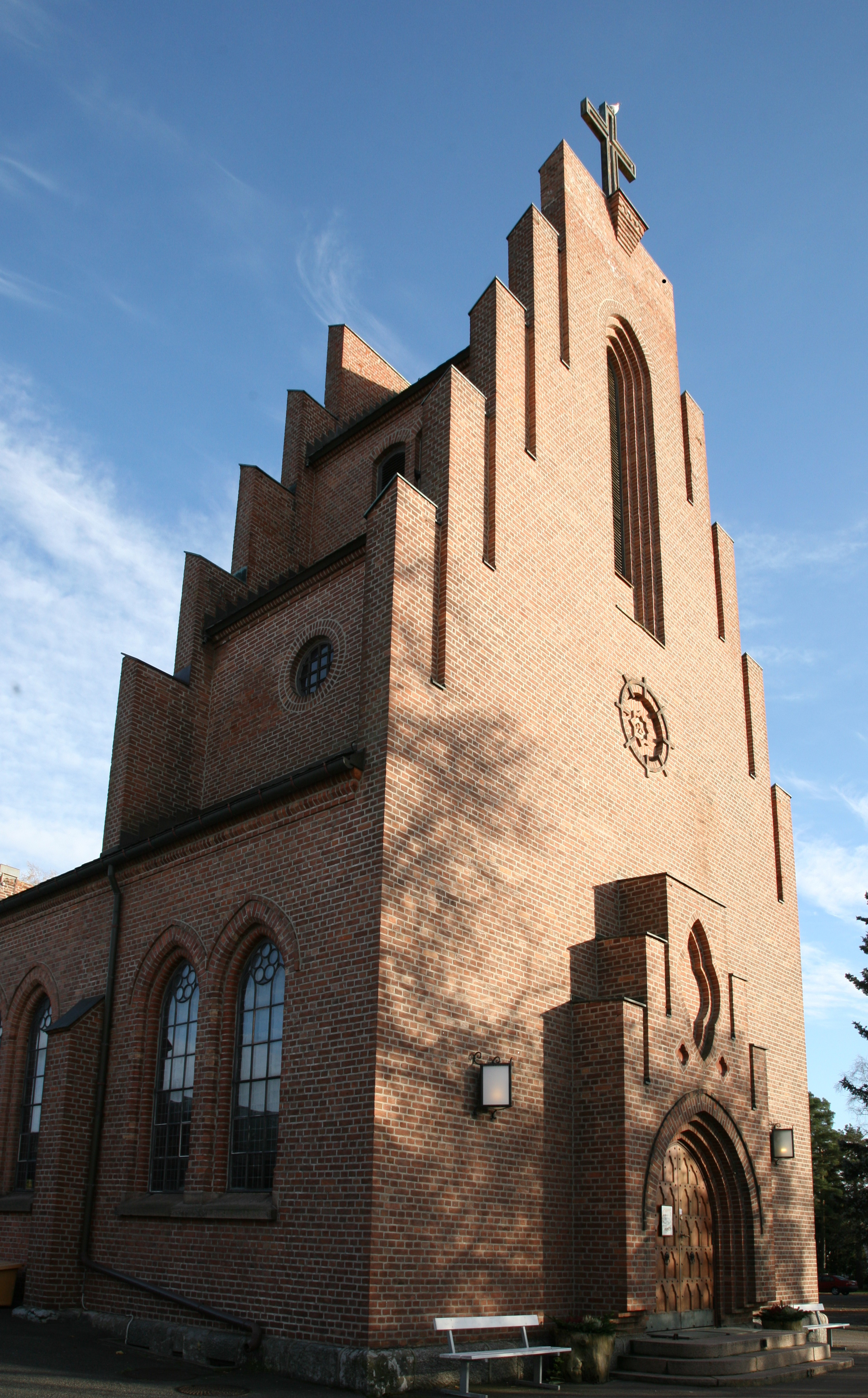
- Nordstrand Church
- Location: Ekebergveien 238, Bydel Nordstrand, Oslo,
- Country: Norway
- Denomination: Church of Norway
- Churchmanship: Evangelical Lutheran

History
- Former name(s): Østre Aker kapell Sæter kapell
- Status: Parish church
- Consecrated: 1866

Architecture
- Functional status: Active
- Style: Original Neo Gothic
- Completed: 2015

Specifications
- Materials: Red brick

Administration
- Diocese: Diocese of Oslo
- Deanery: Søndre Aker
- Parish: Nordstrand

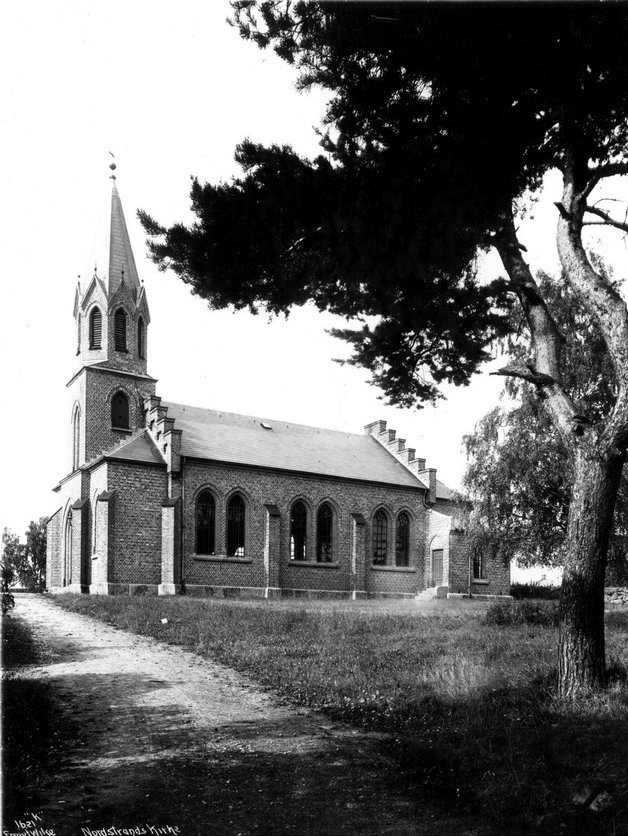
Nordstrand Church in 1929 with the original church tower

Nordstrand Church is a church in Oslo, Norway. The church was consecrated in 1866 as Østre Aker Chapel and was later renamed Sæter Chapel. In 1905 the Nordstrand congregation was established, and the following year the church changed its name again to Nordstrand Church. The church was built in red brick in neo-Gothic style by architect Jacob Wilhelm Nordan. In 1886 a sacristy was added, and in 1935 it was extended and given a new church tower to the west, drawn by architect Georg Greve. The last and largest expansion took place in 2014 to 2015. Then the church was extended 26 meters to the east and the church congregation got new facilities in the basement. The number of seats in the church room was increased from approx. 300 to 480. Architects for the remodeling work were Are Meinich and Trine-Lise Sonne. The church was reconsecrated on Sunday, August 23, 2015, by bishop of Oslo Ole Christian Kvarme.

The church is surrounded by a cemetery.

The Norwegian Directorate for Cultural Heritage has listed Nordstrand Church as a church site, and approved the recent renovations and extensions.

== Interior ==
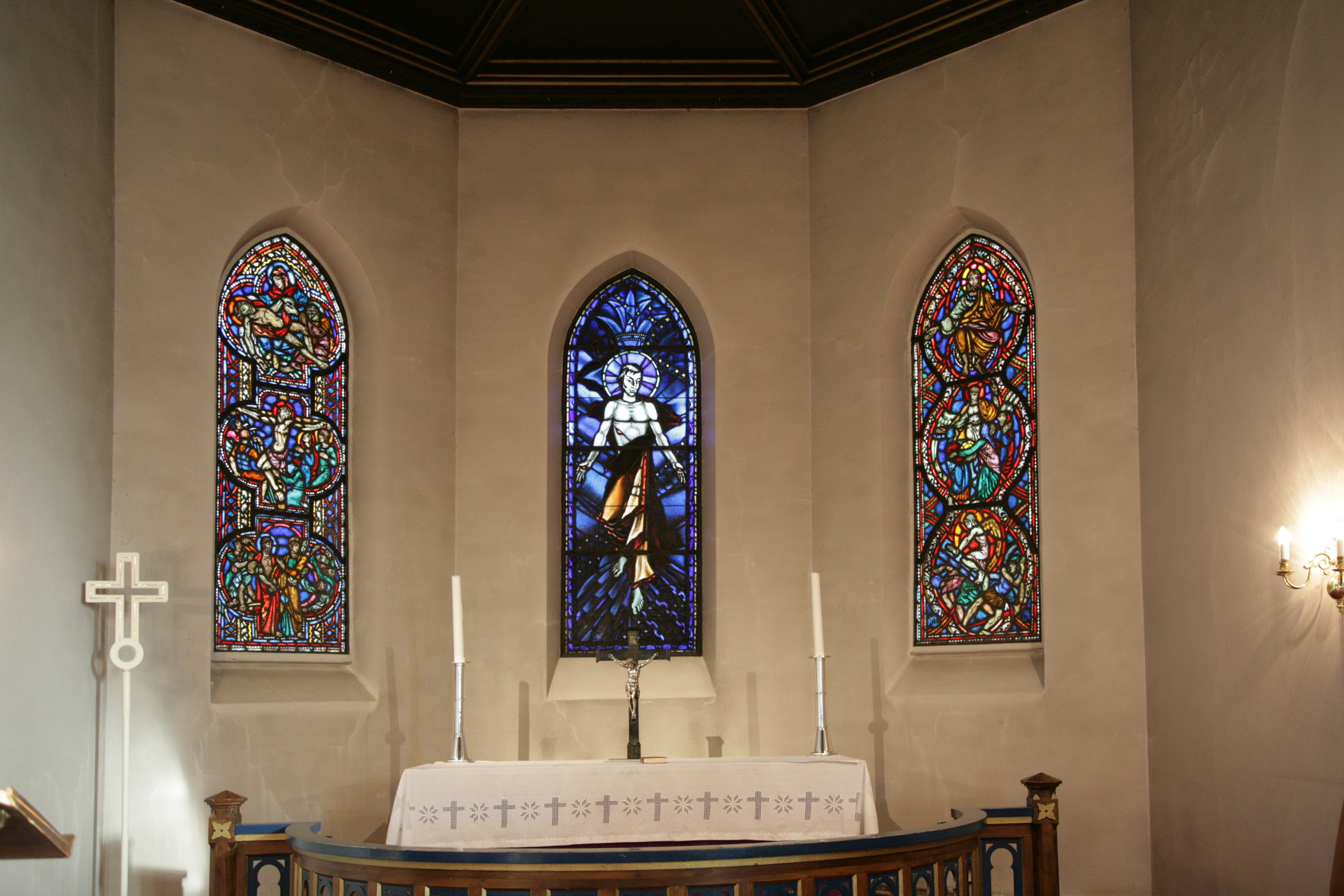
The altarpiece in stained glass, created by Frøydis Haavardsholm

There are three stained glass windows constituting the altarpiece, created by Frøydis Haavardsholm. There are two church organs, one on the organ balcony and a smaller one in the choir. The main church organ is a pneumatic instrument with 24 voices, made in 1935. There are two church bells in the church, from 1865 and 1870 respectively.
