= Skåtøy Municipality =

Former municipality in Norway

Skåtøy Municipality Skåtøy herred
- Former municipality
- Skaatø herred (historic name)
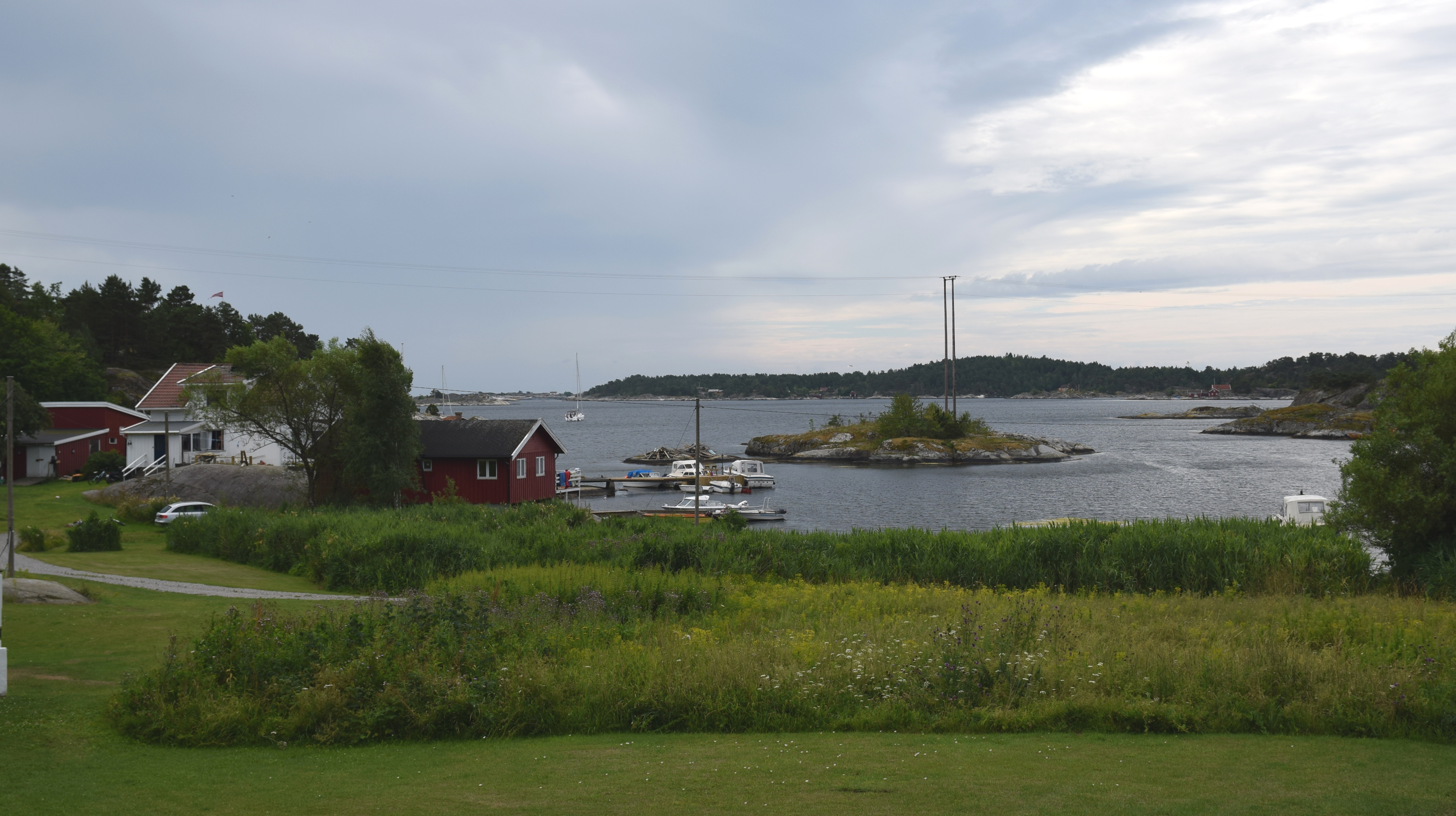
- View from Åsvika in Skåtøy

- Telemark within Norway

- Skåtøy within Telemark
- Coordinates: 58°51′51″N 9°30′33″E
- Country: Norway
- County: Telemark
- District: Vestmar
- Established: 1 Jan 1882
  - Preceded by: Sandøkedal Municipality
- Disestablished: 1 Jan 1960
  - Succeeded by: Kragerø Municipality
- Administrative centre: Skåtøy

Area (upon dissolution)
  - Total: 113.2 km^{2} (43.7 sq mi)
  - Rank: #517 in Norway
- Highest elevation (Lovisenbergkollen): 190 m (620 ft)

Population (1959)
  - Total: 3,189
  - Rank: #278 in Norway
  - Density: 28.2/km^{2} (73/sq mi)
  - Change (10 years): ▼ −1.8%
- Demonym: Skåtøying

Official language
  - Norwegian form: Neutral
- Time zone: UTC+01:00 (CET)
  - Summer (DST): UTC+02:00 (CEST)
- ISO 3166 code: NO-0815

Skåtøy (Norwegian pronunciation: [ˈskoːtœʏ]; locally [ˈskoːtøʏ]) is a former municipality in Telemark county, Norway. The 113.2-square-kilometre (43.7 sq mi) municipality existed from 1882 until its dissolution in 1960. The area is now part of Kragerø Municipality. The administrative centre was the village of Skåtøy on the island of Skåtøy where the Skåtøy Church is located.

Prior to its dissolution in 1960, the 113.2-square-kilometre (43.7 sq mi) municipality was the 517th largest by area out of the 743 municipalities in Norway. Skåtøy Municipality was the 278th most populous municipality in Norway with a population of about 3,189. The municipality's population density was 28.2 inhabitants per square kilometre (73/sq mi) and its population had decreased by 1.8% over the previous 10-year period.

== General information ==
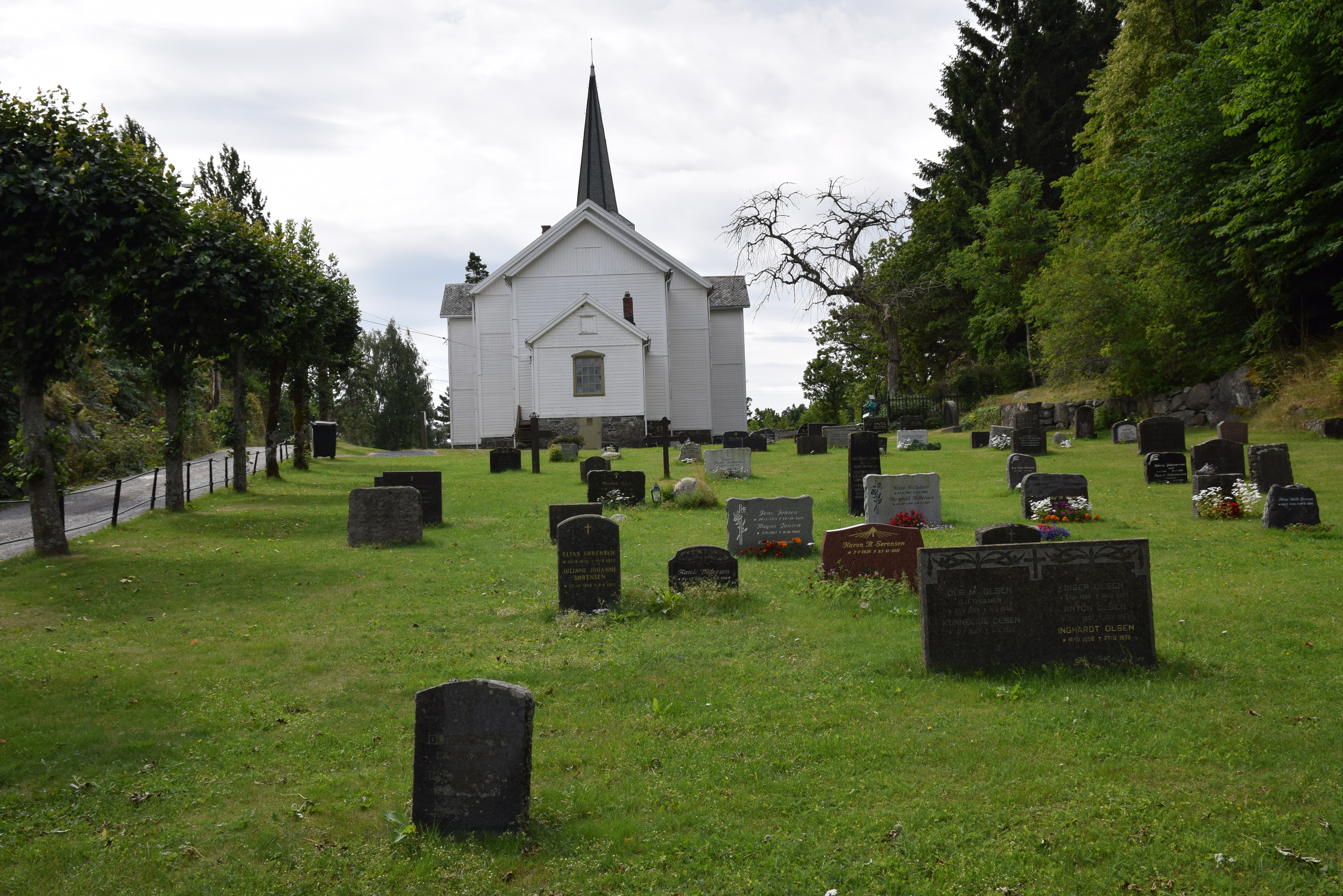
View of the Skåtøy Church

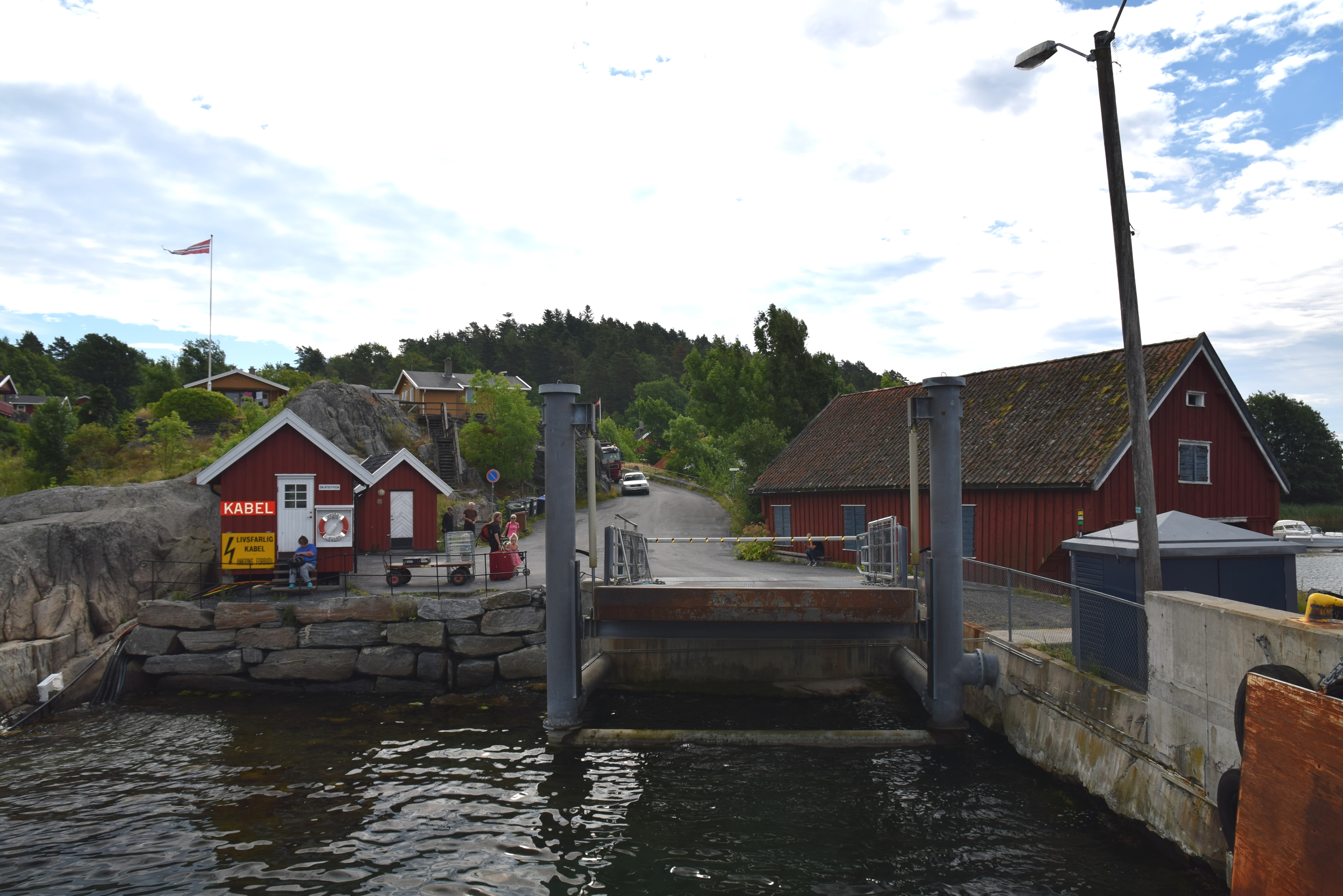
View of a ferry quay in Skåtøy

=== Administrative history ===
The municipality of Skaatø (later spelled Skåtøy) was established on 1 January 1882 when Sandøkedal Municipality was divided into two: the southeastern coastal and island district (population: 3,907) became the new Skaatø Municipality and the northwestern district (population: 2,186) continued as a smaller Sandøkedal Municipality.

On 1 January 1891, an area of Skaatø Municipality (population: 809) that was adjacent to the growing town of Kragerø was annexed and transferred from Skaatø Municipality to Kragerø Municipality.

During the 1960s, there were many municipal mergers across Norway due to the work of the Schei Committee. On 1 January 1960, Sannidal Municipality was dissolved and the following areas were merged to form an enlarged Kragerø Municipality:

- all of Skåtøy Municipality (population: 3,208)
- all of Kragerø Municipality (population: 4,638)
- all of Sannidal Municipality (population: 2,604)

=== Name ===
The municipality is named after the old Skåtøy prestegjeld. The prestegjeld was named after the island of Skåtøy (Old Norse: Skotøy) since the first Skåtøy Church was built there. The first element is identical to the word skot which means "overhang" or "projection of land". The last element is identical to the word øy which means "island".

Historically, the name of the municipality was spelled Skaatø. On 3 November 1917, a royal resolution changed the spelling of the name of the municipality to Skaatøy. The letter y was added to the end of the word to "Norwegianize" the name (ø is the Danish word for "island" and øy is the Norwegian word). On 21 December 1917, a royal resolution enacted the 1917 Norwegian language reforms. Prior to this change, the name was spelled Skaatøy with the digraph "aa", and after this reform, the name was spelled Skåtøy, using the letter å instead.

=== Churches ===
The Church of Norway had one parish (sokn) within Skåtøy Municipality. At the time of the municipal dissolution, it was part of the Skåtøy prestegjeld and the Bamble prosti (deanery) in the Diocese of Agder.

Churches in Skåtøy Municipality
Parish (sokn)	Church name	Location of the church	Year built
Skåtøy	Skåtøy Church	Skåtøy	1862
Skåtøy	Levang Chapel	Støle	1892

== Geography ==
The municipality included the coastal lands surrounding the town of Kragerø on the mainland plus many surrounding islands. The highest point in the municipality was the 190-metre (620 ft) tall mountain Lovisenbergkollen. Bamble Municipality was located to the north, the Skagerrak was located to the east and south, Søndeled Municipality (in Aust-Agder county) was located to the southwest, Sannidal Municipality was located to the west, and the town of Kragerø was located as an enclave in the central part of Skåtøy Municipality.

== Government ==
While it existed, Skåtøy Municipality was responsible for primary education (through 10th grade), outpatient health services, senior citizen services, welfare and other social services, zoning, economic development, and municipal roads and utilities. The municipality was governed by a municipal council of directly elected representatives. The mayor was indirectly elected by a vote of the municipal council. The municipality was under the jurisdiction of the Kragerø District Court and the Agder Court of Appeal.

=== Municipal council ===
The municipal council (Herredsstyre) of Skåtøy Municipality was made up of representatives that were elected to four-year terms. The tables below show the historical composition of the council by political party.

Skåtøy herredsstyre 1955–1959
Party name (in Norwegian)	Number of representatives
Labour Party (Arbeiderpartiet)	11
Conservative Party (Høyre)	2
Communist Party (Kommunistiske Parti)	1
Christian Democratic Party (Kristelig Folkeparti)	3
Farmers' Party (Bondepartiet)	2
Liberal Party (Venstre)	2
Total number of members:	21
Note: On 1 January 1960, Skåtøy Municipality became part of Kragerø Municipality.

Skåtøy herredsstyre 1951–1955
Party name (in Norwegian)	Number of representatives
Labour Party (Arbeiderpartiet)	10
Conservative Party (Høyre)	2
Christian Democratic Party (Kristelig Folkeparti)	3
Farmers' Party (Bondepartiet)	1
Liberal Party (Venstre)	4
Total number of members:	20

Skåtøy herredsstyre 1947–1951
Party name (in Norwegian)	Number of representatives
Labour Party (Arbeiderpartiet)	9
Communist Party (Kommunistiske Parti)	1
Christian Democratic Party (Kristelig Folkeparti)	5
Liberal Party (Venstre)	2
Joint list of the Conservative Party (Høyre) and the Farmers' Party (Bondepartiet)	3
Total number of members:	20

Skåtøy herredsstyre 1945–1947
Party name (in Norwegian)	Number of representatives
Labour Party (Arbeiderpartiet)	10
Conservative Party (Høyre)	1
Communist Party (Kommunistiske Parti)	1
Christian Democratic Party (Kristelig Folkeparti)	5
Joint list of the Liberal Party (Venstre) and the Radical People's Party (Radikale Folkepartiet)	3
Total number of members:	20

Skåtøy herredsstyre 1937–1941*
Party name (in Norwegian)	Number of representatives
Labour Party (Arbeiderpartiet)	7
Conservative Party (Høyre)	4
Farmers' Party (Bondepartiet)	2
Liberal Party (Venstre)	6
Local List(s) (Lokale lister)	1
Total number of members:	20
Note: Due to the German occupation of Norway during World War II, no elections were held for new municipal councils until after the war ended in 1945.

Skåtøy herredsstyre 1934–1937
Party name (in Norwegian)	Number of representatives
Labour Party (Arbeiderpartiet)	6
Farmers' Party (Bondepartiet)	2
Liberal Party (Venstre)	9
Joint list of the Conservative Party (Høyre) and the Free-minded People's Party (Frisinnede Folkeparti)	3
Total number of members:	20

Skåtøy herredsstyre 1931–1934
Party name (in Norwegian)	Number of representatives
Labour Party (Arbeiderpartiet)	7
Farmers' Party (Bondepartiet)	2
Liberal Party (Venstre)	5
Joint list of the Conservative Party (Høyre) and the Free-minded People's Party (Frisinnede Folkeparti)	3
Local List(s) (Lokale lister)	3
Total number of members:	20

Skåtøy herredsstyre 1928–1931
Party name (in Norwegian)	Number of representatives
Labour Party (Arbeiderpartiet)	4
Farmers' Party (Bondepartiet)	5
Liberal Party (Venstre)	4
Joint list of the Conservative Party (Høyre) and the Free-minded Liberal Party (Frisinnede Venstre)	3
Local List(s) (Lokale lister)	4
Total number of members:	20

Skåtøy herredsstyre 1925–1928
Party name (in Norwegian)	Number of representatives
Labour Democrats (Arbeiderdemokratene)	4
Liberal Party (Venstre)	6
Joint list of the Conservative Party (Høyre) and the Free-minded Liberal Party (Frisinnede Venstre)	6
List of workers, fishermen, and small farmholders (Arbeidere, fiskere, småbrukere liste)	4
Total number of members:	20

Skåtøy herredsstyre 1922–1925
Party name (in Norwegian)	Number of representatives
Labour Party (Arbeiderpartiet)	6
Joint list of the Conservative Party (Høyre) and the Free-minded Liberal Party (Frisinnede Venstre)	6
Joint list of the Liberal Party (Venstre) and the Labour Democrats (Arbeiderdemokratene)	8
Total number of members:	20

Skåtøy herredsstyre 1919–1922
Party name (in Norwegian)	Number of representatives
Labour Party (Arbeiderpartiet)	4
Joint list of the Conservative Party (Høyre) and the Free-minded Liberal Party (Frisinnede Venstre)	4
Joint list of the Liberal Party (Venstre) and the Labour Democrats (Arbeiderdemokratene)	12
Total number of members:	20

Skaatø herredsstyre 1916–1919
Party name (in Norwegian)	Number of representatives
Labour Party (Arbeiderpartiet)	4
Joint list of the Conservative Party (Høyre) and the Free-minded Liberal Party (Frisinnede Venstre)	4
Joint list of the Liberal Party (Venstre) and the Labour Democrats (Arbeiderdemokratene)	12
Total number of members:	20

Skaatø herredsstyre 1913–1916
Party name (in Norwegian)	Number of representatives
Labour Party (Arbeiderpartiet)	5
Free-minded Liberal Party (Frisinnede Venstre)	4
Joint list of the Liberal Party (Venstre) and the Labour Democrats (Arbeiderdemokratene)	11
Total number of members:	20

Skaatø herredsstyre 1910–1913
Party name (in Norwegian)	Number of representatives
Liberal Party (Venstre)	6
List of workers, fishermen, and small farmholders (Arbeidere, fiskere, småbrukere liste)	11
Local List(s) (Lokale lister)	3
Total number of members:	20

Skaatø herredsstyre 1907–1910
Party name (in Norwegian)	Number of representatives
Labour Democrats (Arbeiderdemokratene)	9
Liberal Party (Venstre)	7
Coalition Party (Samlingspartiet)	4
Total number of members:	20

=== Mayors ===
The mayor (Norwegian: ordfører) of Skåtøy Municipality was the political leader of the municipality and the chairperson of the municipal council. The following people have held this position:

- 1882–1887: Henrik Pedersen
- 1888–1889: Hartvig Pedersen
- 1890–1893: Peder Rinde (V)
- 1894–1897: Ole Sartz
- 1898–1909: Nils O. Olsen
- 1909–1912: Lars Nilsen Midgaard (V)
- 1912–1917: C.A. Larsen
- 1917–1923: Halvor Levang
- 1923–1925: Lars Jørgensen
- 1926–1928: Paul J. Nilssen
- 1929–1933: Lars Jørgensen
- 1933–1941: Karl Ørvik (V)
- 1941–1943: Hartvik Kjønnås (NS)
- 1943–1945: Knut F. Gumø (NS)
- 1945–1945: Karl Ørvik (V)
- 1946–1951: Sverre Masterød (Ap)
- 1951–1960: Arne Midgaard (Ap)

== See also ==
- List of former municipalities of Norway
