= Grønland Church =

- Grønland kirke
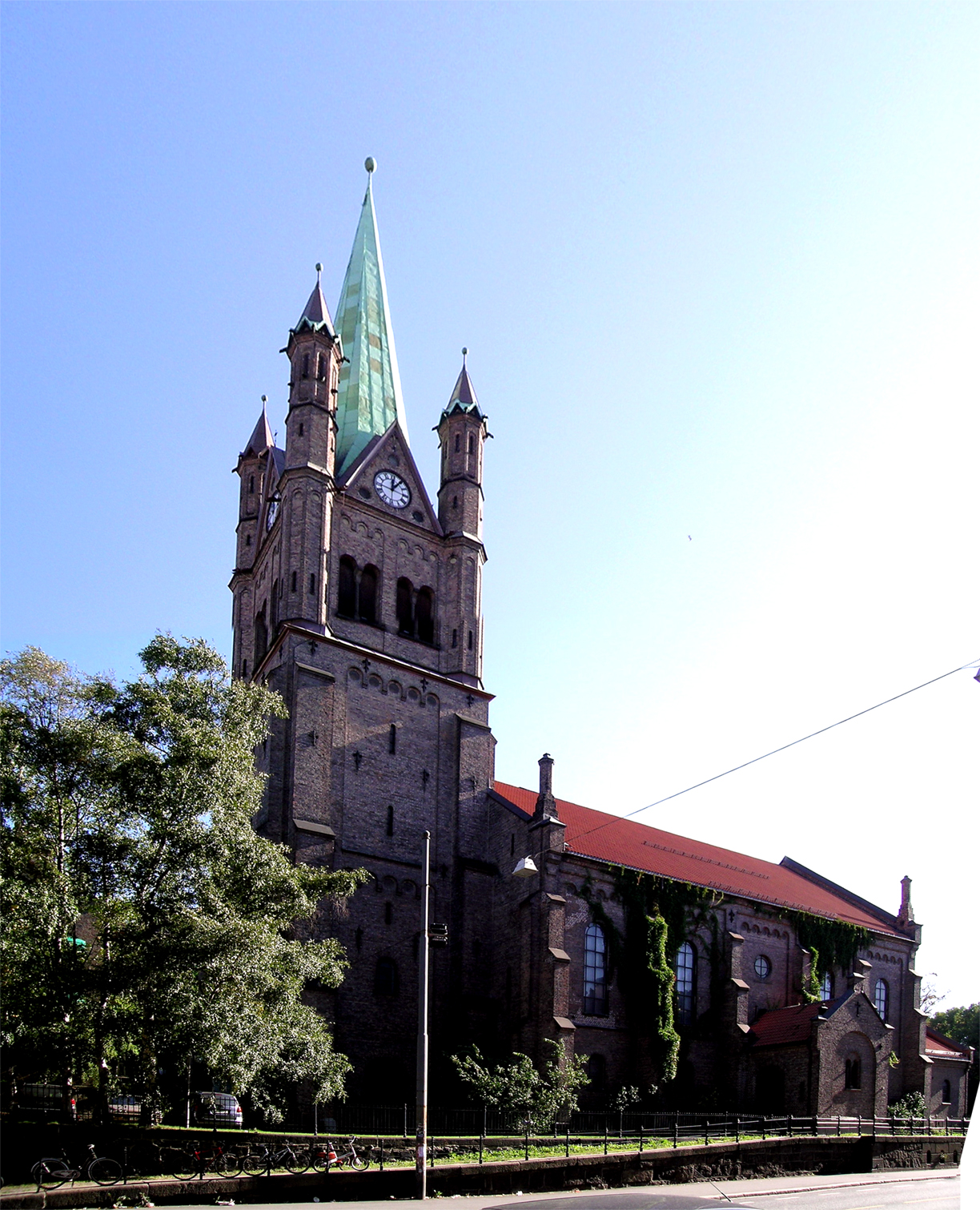

- Location within Oslo Location within Norway
- 59°54′39.852″N 10°46′3.5904″E
- Location: Grønlndsleiret 34, Oslo,
- Country: Norway
- Denomination: Church of Norway
- Churchmanship: Evangelical Lutheran
- Website: kirken.no/gamlebyenoggronland

History
- Status: Parish church
- Consecrated: March 3, 1869

Architecture
- Functional status: Active
- Architect: Wilhelm von Hanno
- Style: Neo Romanesque architecture

Specifications
- Materials: Brick

Administration
- Diocese: Diocese of Oslo
- Parish: Gamlebyen og Grønland

Grønland Church (Grønland kirke) is a church located in the neighbourhood of Grønland in the borough of Gamle Oslo in Oslo, Norway.

Grønland Church congregation was formed in 1861. Grønland Church was consecrated on March 3, 1869, by Bishop Jens Lauritz Arup. The church is characterized its tall and monumental tower surrounded by four smaller spires. The structure is of brick, in neo-Romanesque architectural style. Its architect was Wilhelm von Hanno. He also designed the school, former fire station and former police station, together with the church as a unified group of buildings in Grønland, a district that recently (1859) had been incorporated into Christiania (now Oslo).

Grønland Church originally had 1380 seats, which has since been reduced to approx. 800. The church has an historic organ built by Walcker Orgelbau in 1877. It was moved to Grønland Church in 1934. The organ was restored in 1961 by J. H. Jørgensen Orgelfabrik. The church has undergone several restorations, most recently in 1988.

The church owned and operated Vestasol camp at Larkollen off Moss. It hosts social gatherings and meetings, and church members work together in the effort to maintain the camp site.

Grønland Church is a heritage site and is registered in the Norwegian Directorate for Cultural Heritage.
