= Skåtøy Church =

Church in Telemark, Norway

- Skåtøy kirke
- Skjærgårdskatedralen
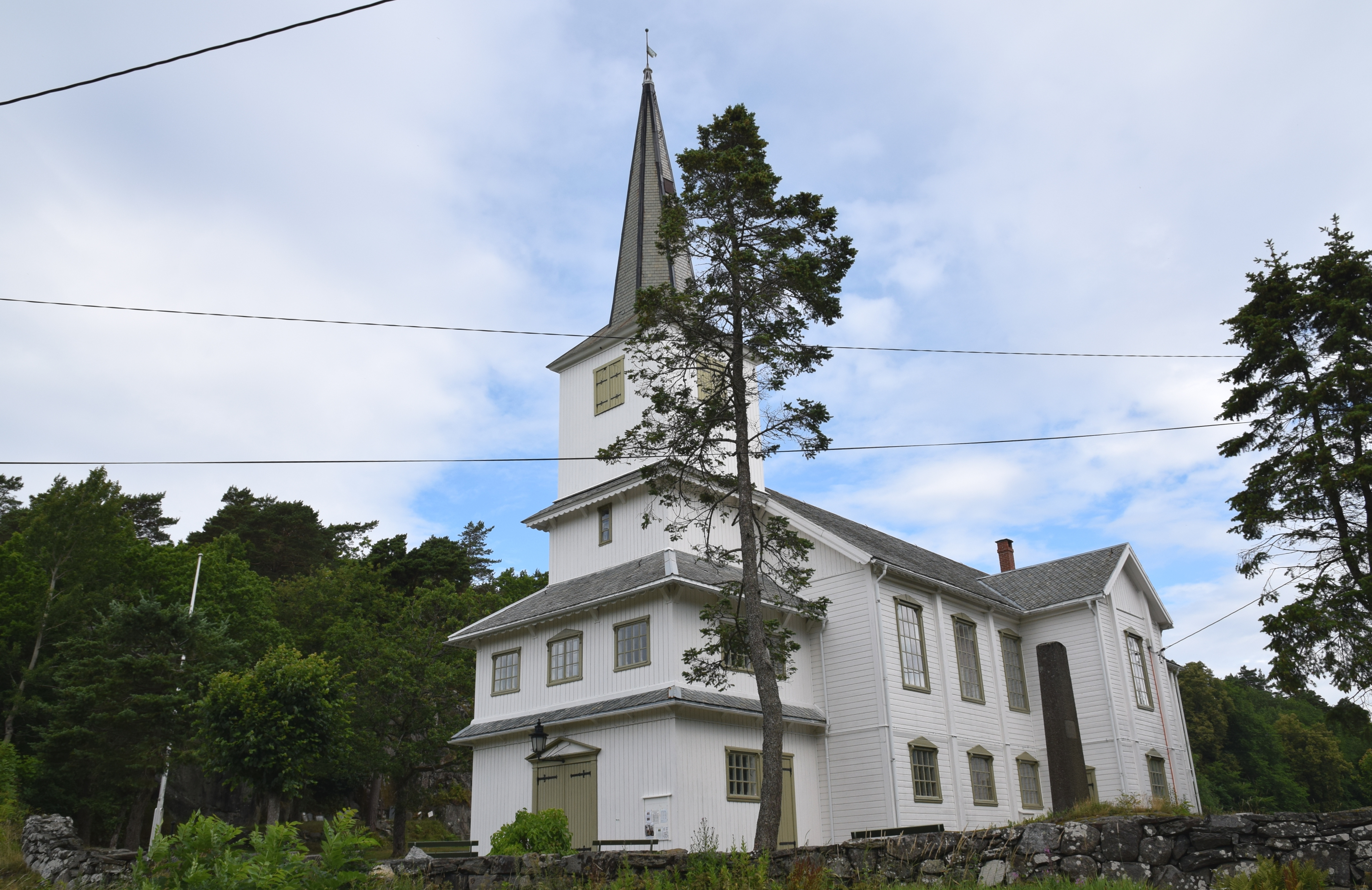
- View of the church
- Skåtøy Church
- 58°51′32″N 9°28′33″E
- Location: Kragerø Municipality, Telemark
- Country: Norway
- Denomination: Church of Norway
- Churchmanship: Evangelical Lutheran

History
- Status: Parish church
- Founded: 1862
- Consecrated: 5 September 1862

Architecture
- Functional status: Active
- Architect(s): H.E. Schirmer and W. von Hanno
- Architectural type: Long church
- Completed: 1862 (164 years ago)

Specifications
- Capacity: 600
- Materials: Wood

Administration
- Diocese: Agder og Telemark
- Deanery: Bamble prosti
- Parish: Skåtøy
- Norwegian Cultural Heritage Site
- Type: Church
- Status: Listed
- ID: 85494

Skåtøy Church (Norwegian: Skåtøy kirke) is a parish church of the Church of Norway in Kragerø Municipality in Telemark county, Norway. It is located on the island of Skåtøy which is located in the skerries just offshore from the town of Kragerø. It is the church for the Skåtøy parish which is part of the Bamble prosti (deanery) in the Diocese of Agder og Telemark. The white, wooden church was built in a long church design in 1862 using plans drawn up by the architects Heinrich Ernst Schirmer and Wilhelm von Hanno. The church seats about 600 people.

The church is sometimes nicknamed the Cathedral of the Skerries (Norwegian: Skjærgårdskatedralen). This historical site is reachable by boat and recalls Kragerø's "golden days". The surrounding 500 islands were the home of farmers, fishermen, lumberjacks and sailors from the 17th century. It is one of the largest churches in Norway built of wood, with seats for 600 people. It was considered the most important church in the region until around 1960.

== History ==
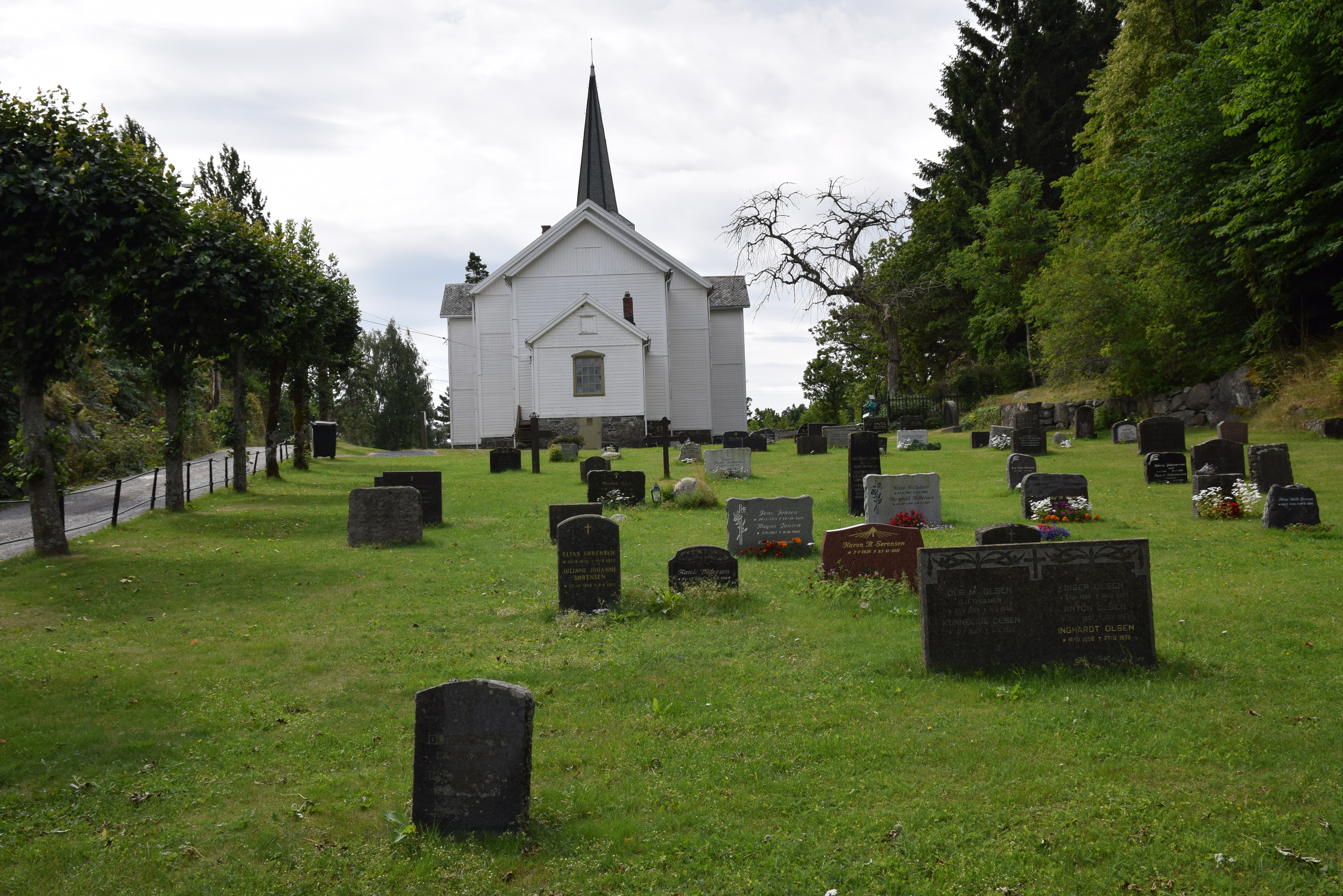
View of the church

During the 19th century there were demands for a local church on the island of Skåtøy. In 1851, a cemetery was consecrated for local use. Nearly ten years later, approval was given to build a church at the cemetery. Heinrich Ernst Schirmer and Wilhelm von Hanno were hired to design the new church. The church was consecrated on 5 September 1862 by the provost of Bamble prosti when Bishop Jacob von der Lippe was unable to attend. The building is a wooden long church. There was a major refurbishment for the jubilee in 1912, and in 1914 the bell tower was rebuilt. In 1918, a new altarpiece was installed and it was painted by Julie Gjessing. The motif is from the Gospel of Mark 1:35 ("Early the next morning, while it was still dark, Jesus got up, went out and went to a deserted place, and prayed there") and portrayed Jesus in prayer. There was renovation in 1930 and again in 1954. In winter when there is often lower attendance, a smaller room called the Winter Church is used on the 2nd floor behind the organ gallery.

== See also ==
- List of churches in Agder og Telemark
