= Frøydis Haavardsholm =

Norwegian visual artist and book illustrator

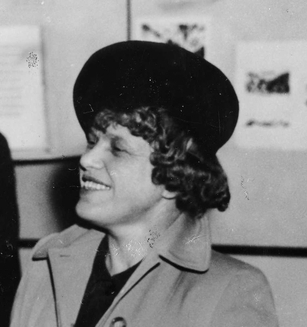
- Born: 1 April 1896 Tromsø, Norway
- Died: 3 October 1984 (aged 88) Oslo, Norway
- Area: visual artist
- Awards: King's Medal of Merit
- Spouse: Hans Henrik Holm

Frøydis Haavardsholm (1 April 1896 – 3 October 1984) was a Norwegian visual artist and book illustrator.

== Biography ==
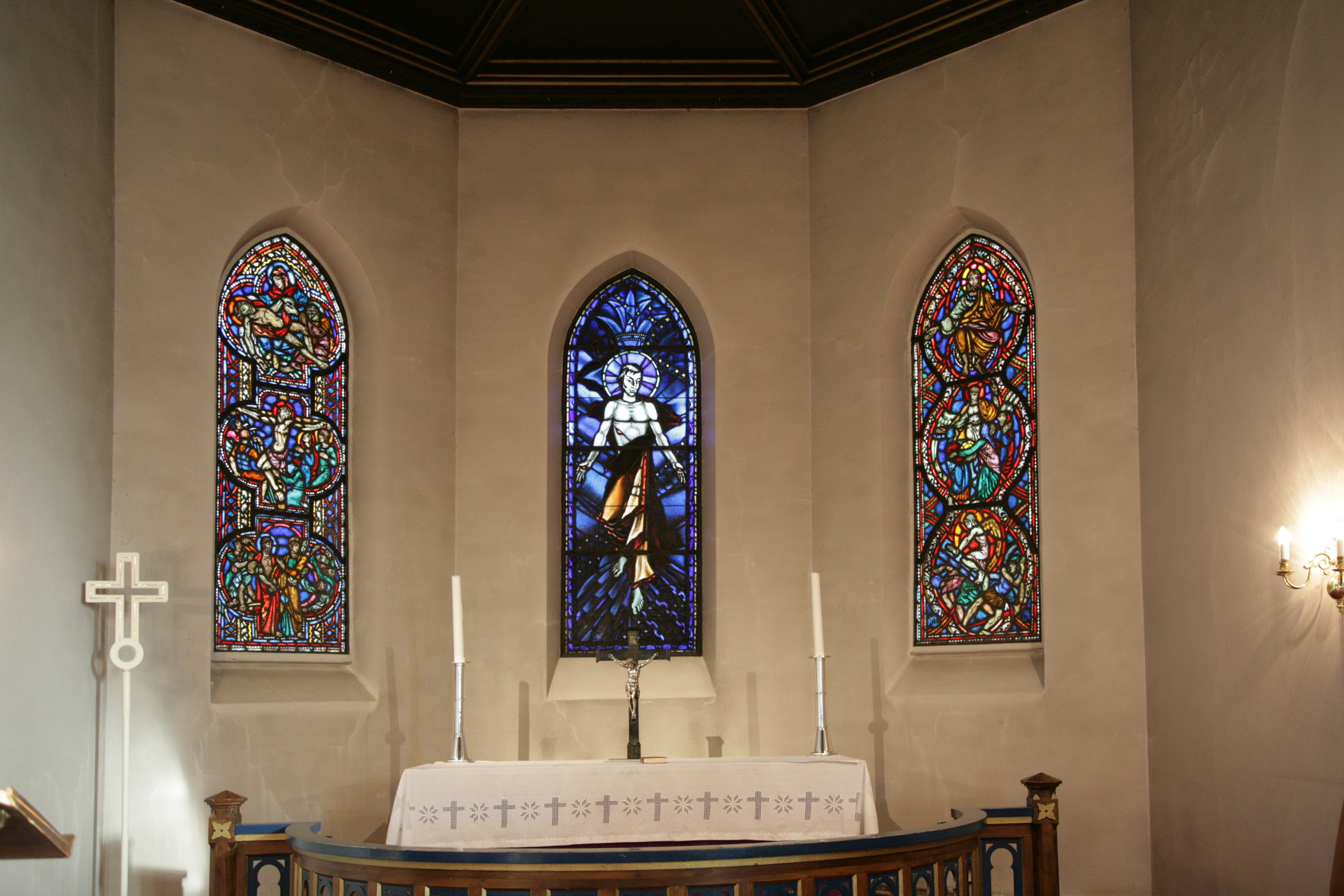
Stained glass over altar at Nordstrand Church

She was born at Tromsø in Troms county, Norway. Her parents were Amund Haavardsholm (1860–1948) and Josefine Nielsen (1872–1952).

She was a student of Oluf Wold-Torne at the Norwegian National Academy of Craft and Art Industry in Oslo during the period 1913–17. She also trained with Erik Werenskiold, Henrik Sørensen and Axel Revold. She received additional training in Paris by Othon Friesz during 1919-20 and traveled in Tuscany and Umbria during 1920–22. On her return trip to Norway, she traveled to Sweden to study Swedish art craft.

Haavardsholm placed significant focus on the area of stained glass painting. She created stained glass in a number of churches in Norway, including Asker Church (in Asker Municipality); Nikolaikirken (in Gran Municipality); Holy Cross Church (in Bergen Municipality); and Nordstrand Church, Østre Aker Church, and Trinity Church (all in Oslo Municipality). Her work dating from 1930 also appears at the Norwegian Museum of Decorative Arts and Design in Oslo.

She illustrated the poetry cycle Jonsoknatt by Hans Henrik Holm (published in 1933) and in the years 1918-1926 she illustrated all the liturgical books of the Church of Norway. She was awarded the Schäffers legat in 1917, Houens legat in 1920, Henrichsens legat in 1927 and Mohrs legat in 1935. In 1953 she received the Norwegian award the King's Medal of Merit (Kongens fortjenstmedalje) in gold.
