= Wilhelm von Hanno =

German-born Norwegian architect (1826–1882)

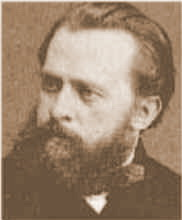
Andreas Friedrich Wilhelm von Hanno

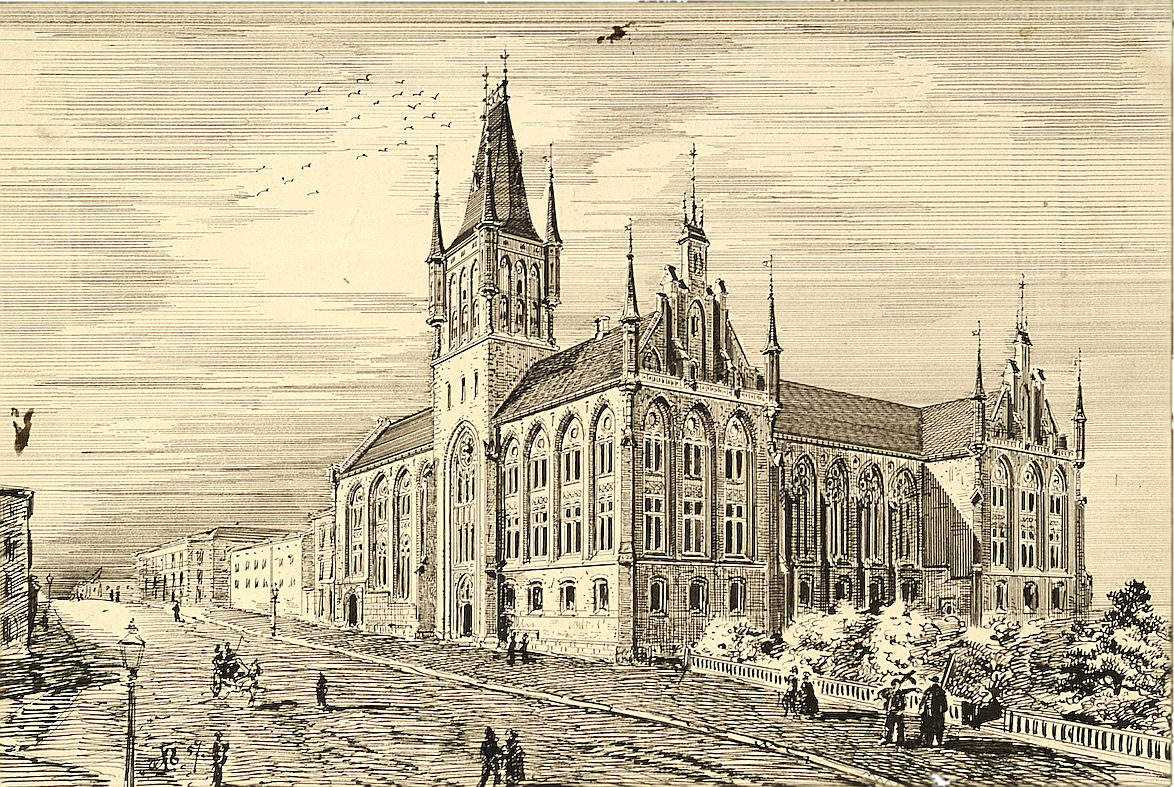
von Hanno and Schirmer's winning (but never built) design for the Parliament of Norway Building

Andreas Friedrich Wilhelm von Hanno (15 December 1826 – 12 December 1882) was a German-born Norwegian architect, sculptor and painter. He was among the leading architects in Norway during the middle of the 1800s.

== Biography ==
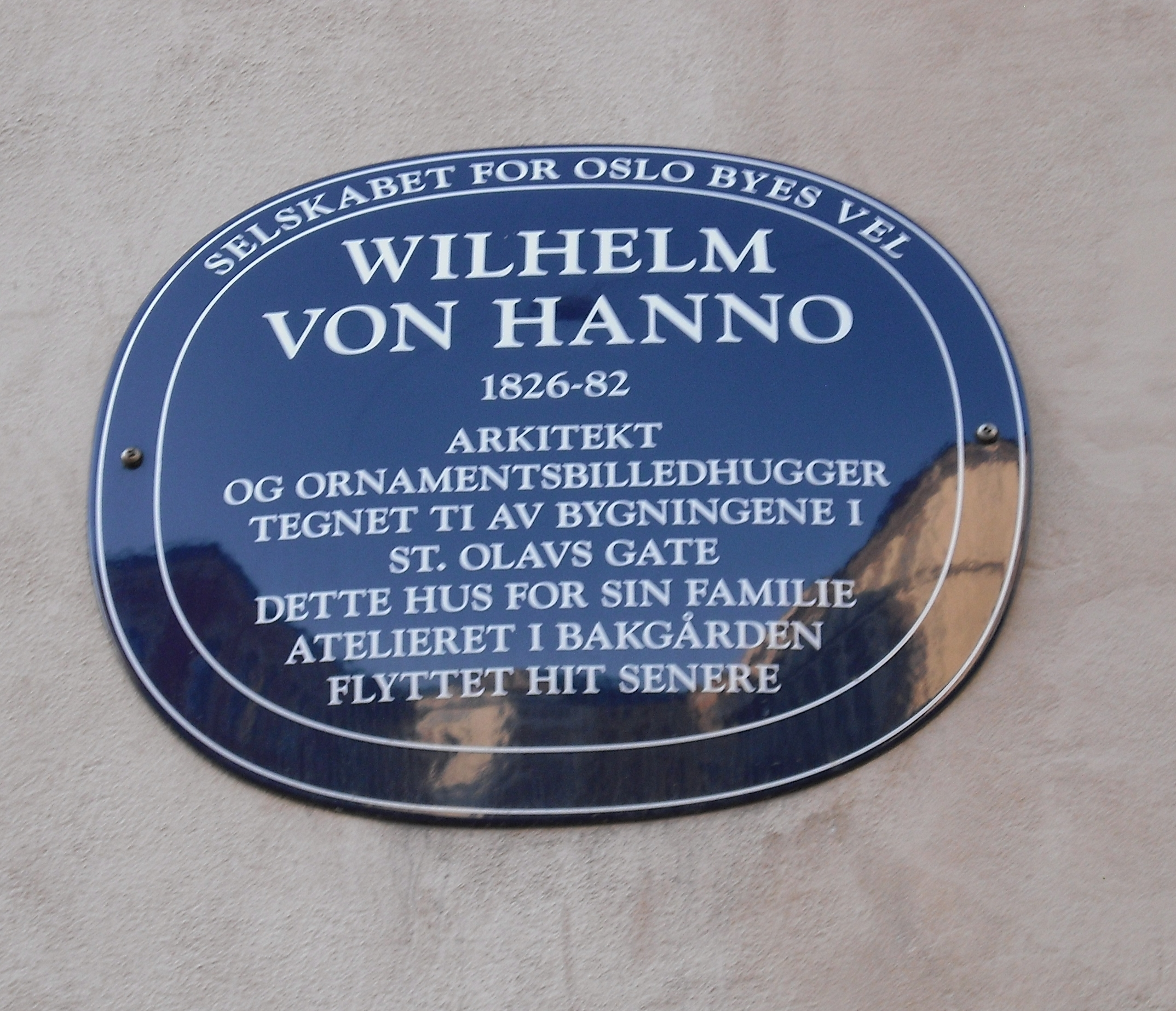
Plaque to von Hanno on St Olav's Gate, Oslo

Wilhelm von Hanno was born in Hamburg, Germany. Wilhelm's father, music teacher and librarian Johann Carl Hübner (born 1790), was a native of Königsberg and later took the additional name von Hanno. Von Hanno was educated at Die Hamburgische Gesellschaft zur Beförderung der Künste und Nützlichen Gewerben in Hamburg between the years 1840–43. German-born architect, Heinrich Ernst Schirmer was appointed the construction manager for the restoration of Oslo Cathedral but when he became ill, in 1850, von Hanno came to Oslo and was retained complete the project.

From about 1851 to 1862, von Hanno entered into partnership with Heinrich Ernst Schirmer and designed a number of important structures including a number of station buildings, military buildings and private residences. Among their works were Gaustad Hospital, Tangen Church (1854), Vestre Aker Church (1853–1855) and Østre Aker Church (1857–1860). Schirmer and Hanno designed all stations on Norway's first railway line, the Hoved Line between Christiania and Eidsvoll which were finished in 1854. Von Hanno designed Oslo's Holy Trinity Church (Trefoldighetskirken) (1858) and the first part of Christiania Station, in cooperation with Heinrich Ernst Schirmer. They also designed the initial plans for the Parliament of Norway Building, but this design was later discarded.

From 1862, Wilhelm von Hanno maintained an architectural office in Christiania. His major commission was for the Grønland Church (1866–1868), Grønland fire and police building at Grønlandsleiret 32, (1866) and the Grønland School at Borggata 2b, (1867). Von Hanno was an accomplished draftsman who also maintained teaching activities, art lessons and field trips for students of architecture. He was a member of the building commission in Christiania 1856-1882, the editorial staff of the Polytechnic Journals 1862-1882 and the Board of Christiania Art Society from 1864 to 1882.

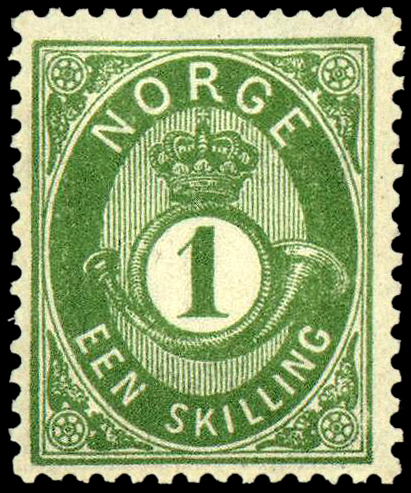
Stamp with horn motif in a series, launched in 1872, designed by von Hanno

In 1872 a set of stamps for Norway Post, designed by von Hanno, was released.

== Personal life ==
In 1859 Wilhelm von Hanno married Maria Theresia Pallenberg (1827–1898). They were the grandparents of Norwegian artist, Carl von Hanno.

== Gallery ==
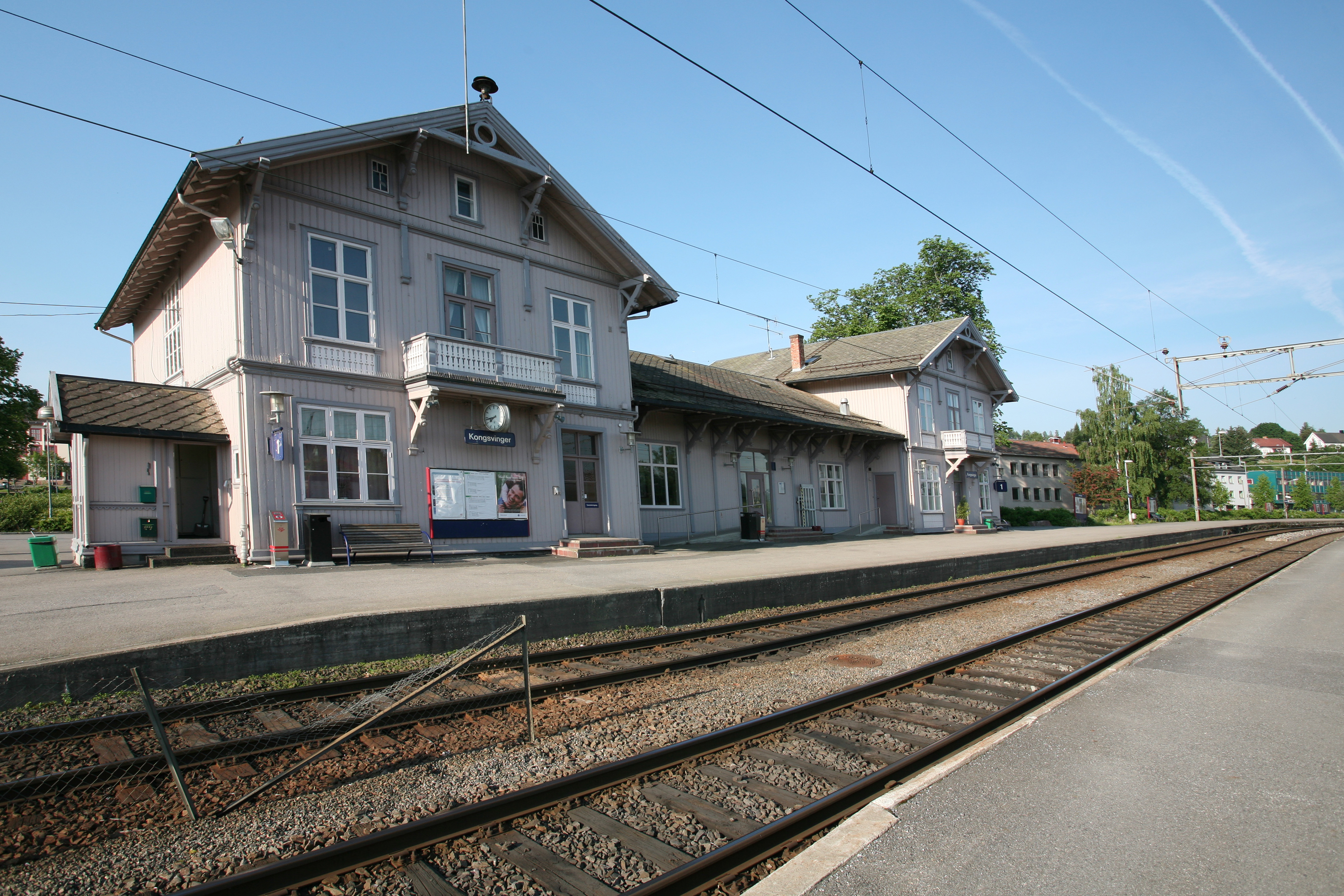
Kongsvinger Station (1862)

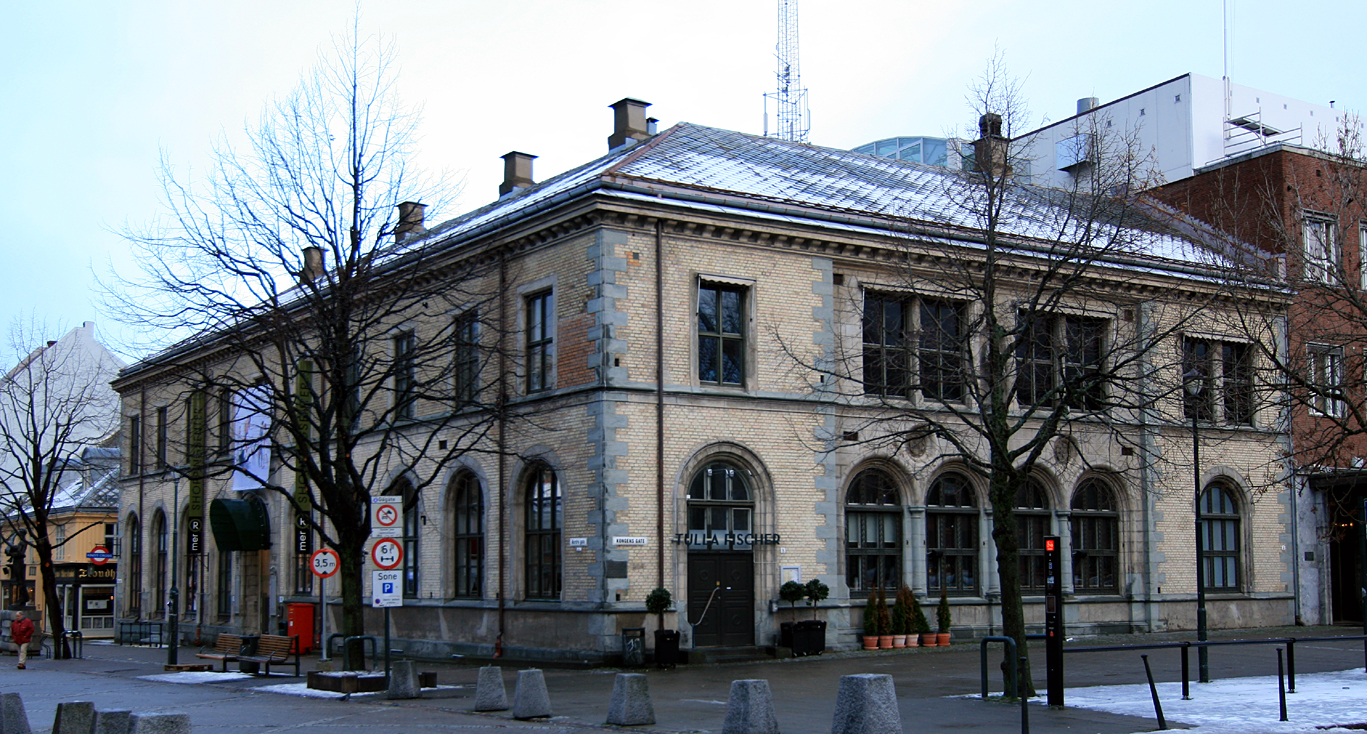
Mercursenteret in Trondheim (1863)

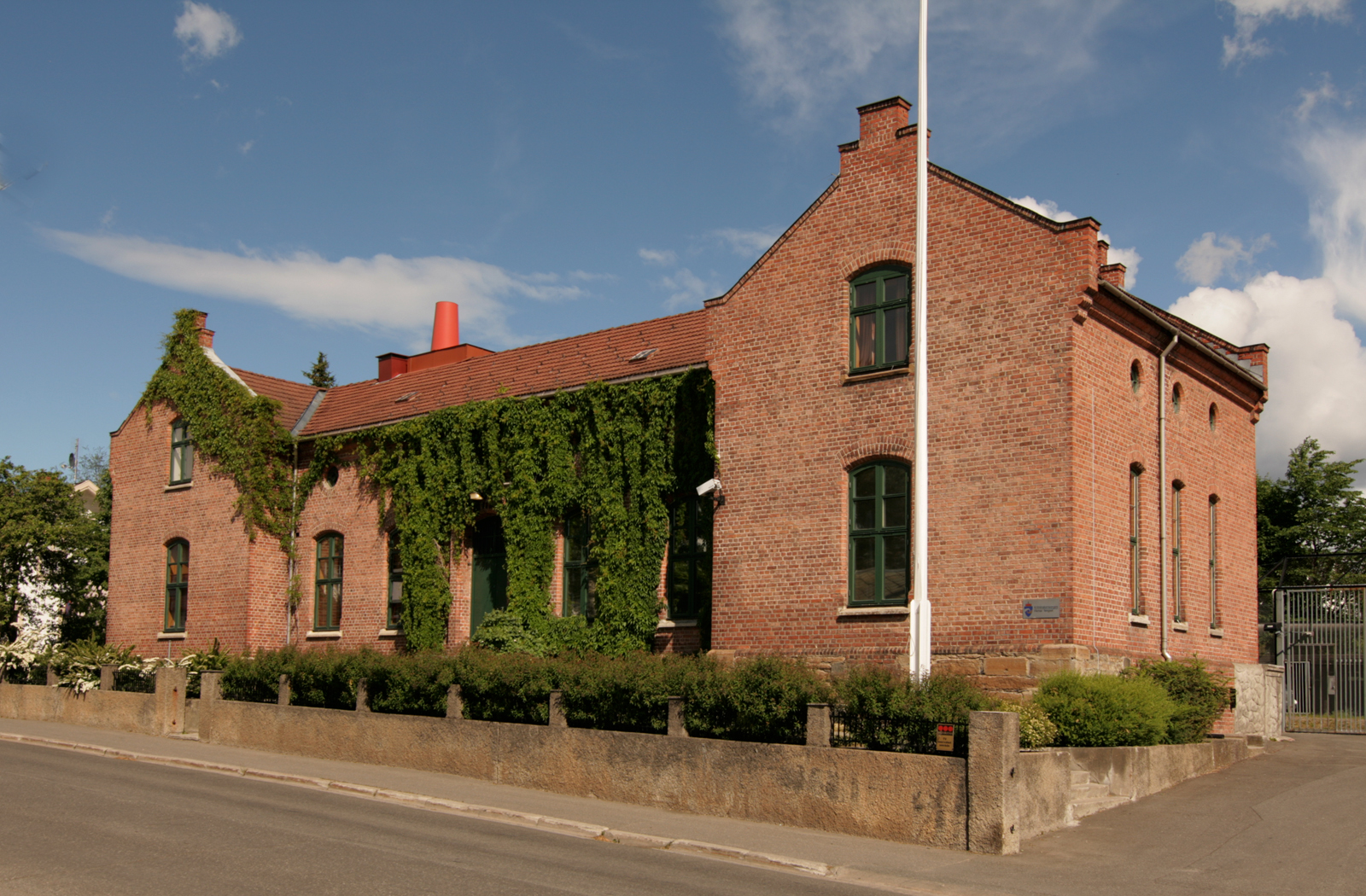
Hamar Prison (1864)

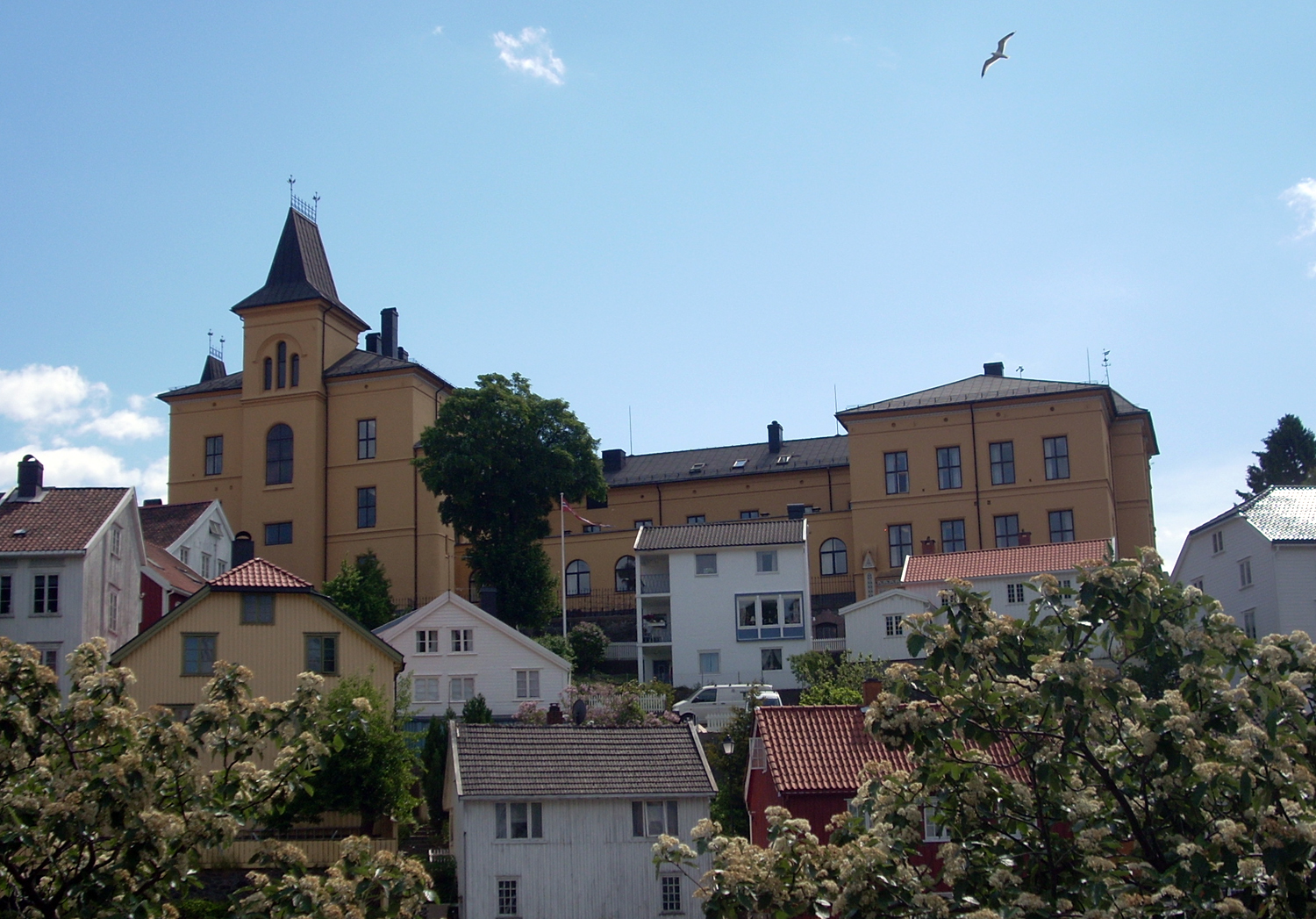
Videregående School, Arendal (1879–82)

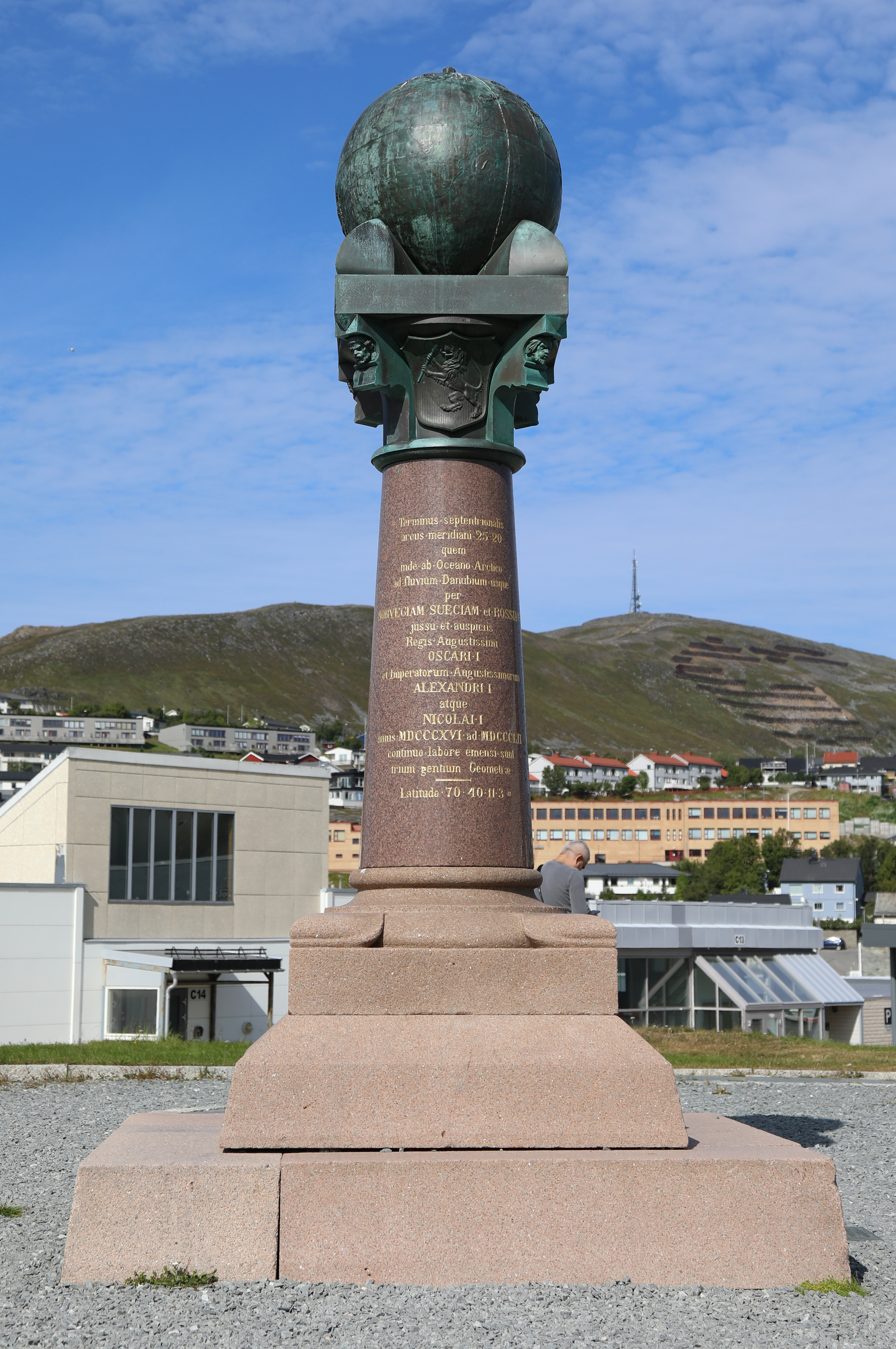
Von Hanno designed the northernmost station of the Struve Geodetic Arc, located in Hammerfest.

=== Churches ===
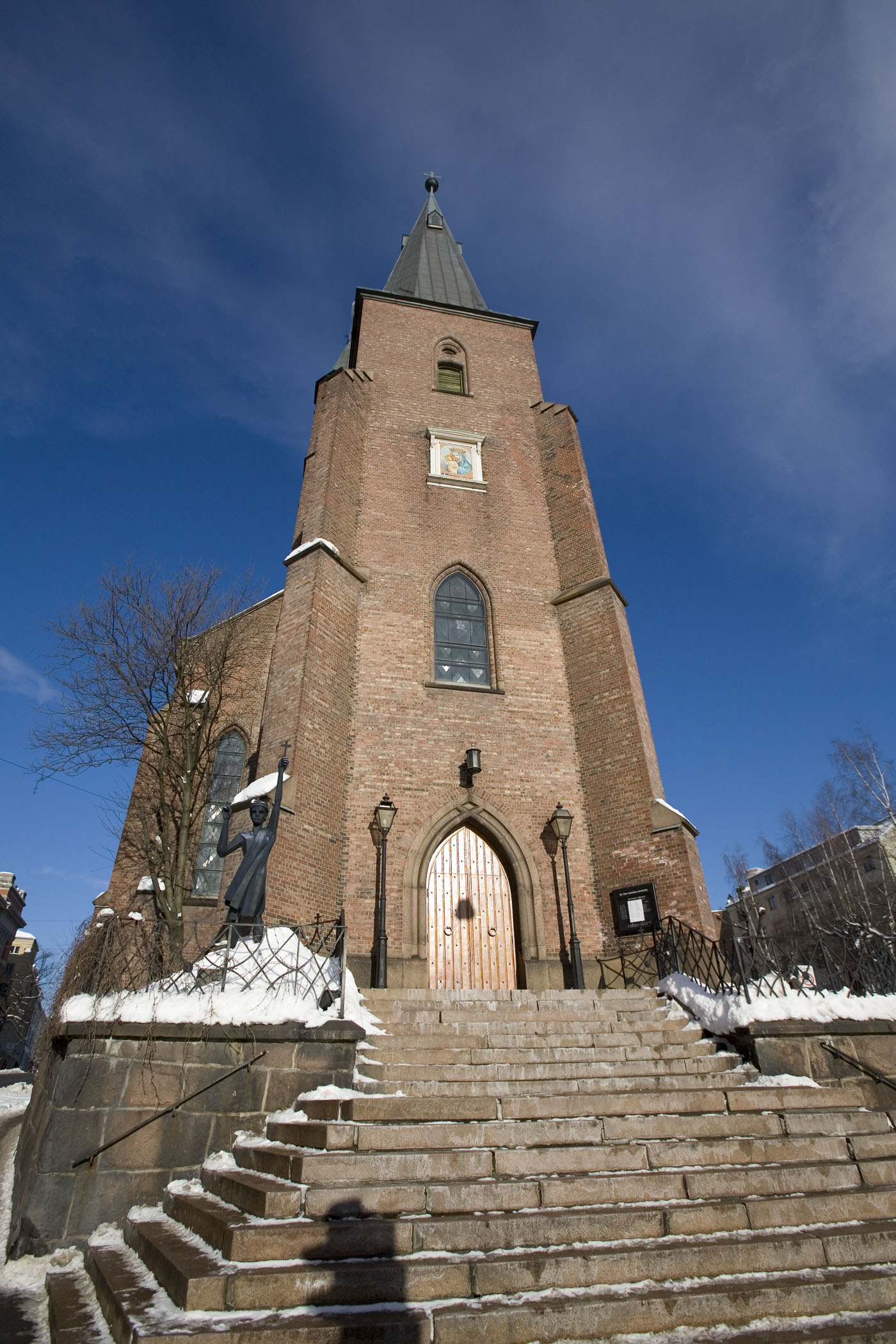
St. Olav's Cathedral, Oslo (1852–1856)

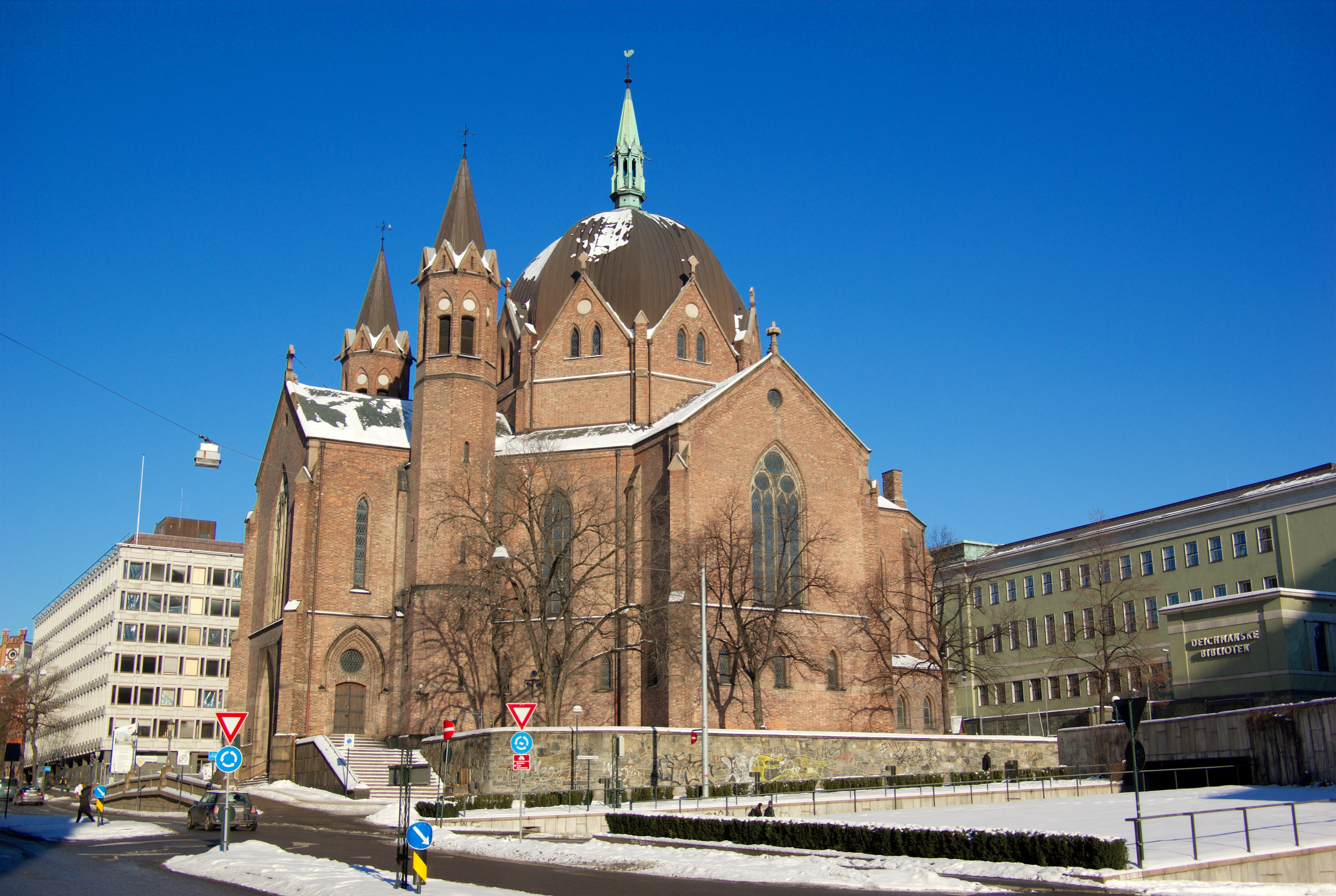
Holy Trinity Church in Oslo (1858)

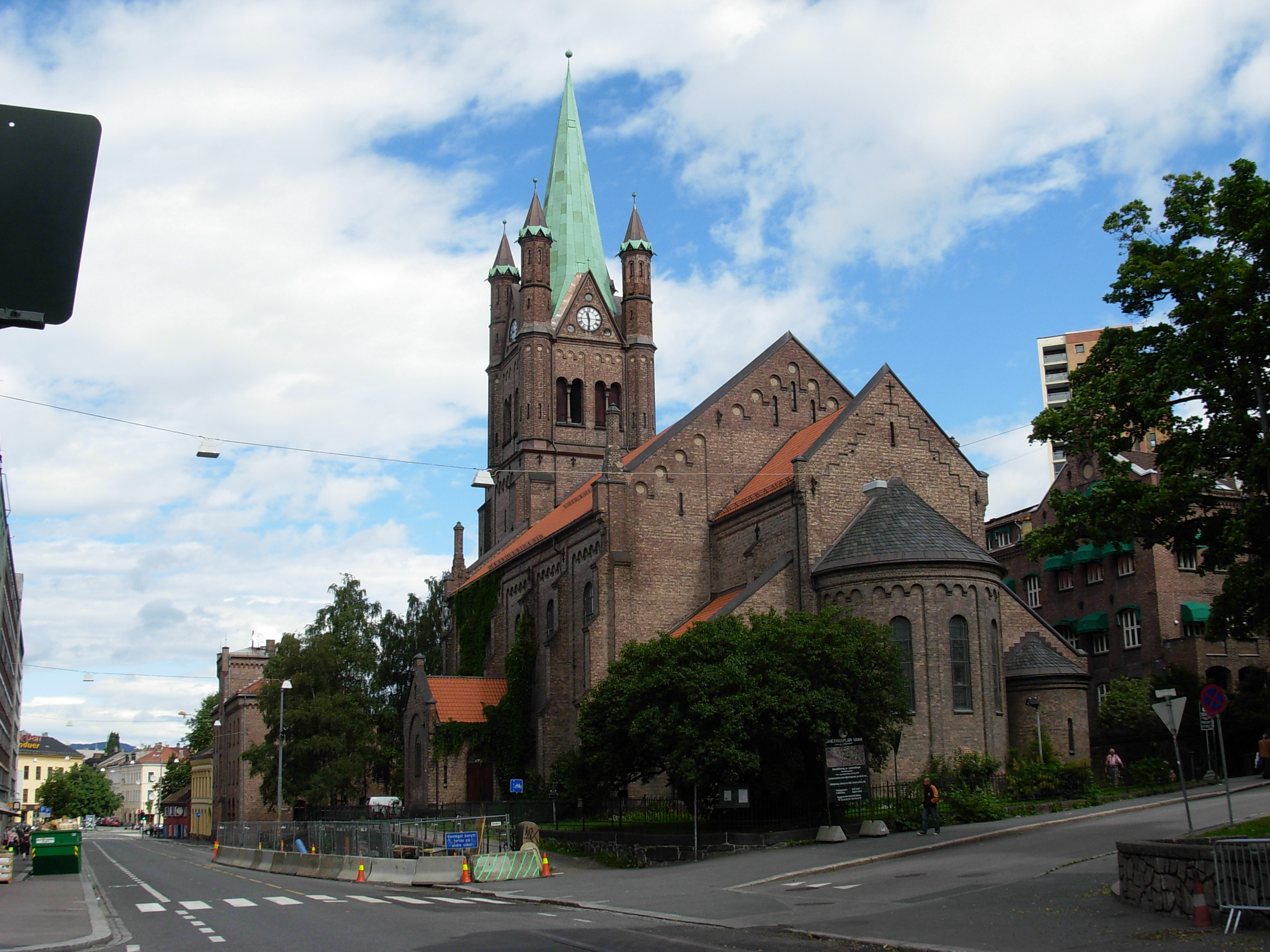
Grønland Church (1866–1868)
