= Grenland Line =

Proposed railway line in Norway

Overview
- Native name: Grenlandsbanen
- Status: Proposed
- Termini: Eidanger/Porsgrunn/Skien; Skorstøl

Service
- Type: Railway
- System: Norwegian railways

Technical
- Line length: 66 km (41 mi)
- Number of tracks: Double
- Character: Passenger
- Track gauge: 1,435 mm (4 ft 8 1/2 in)
- Electrification: 15 kV 16.7 Hz AC
- Operating speed: 250 km/h (155 mph)
Route map
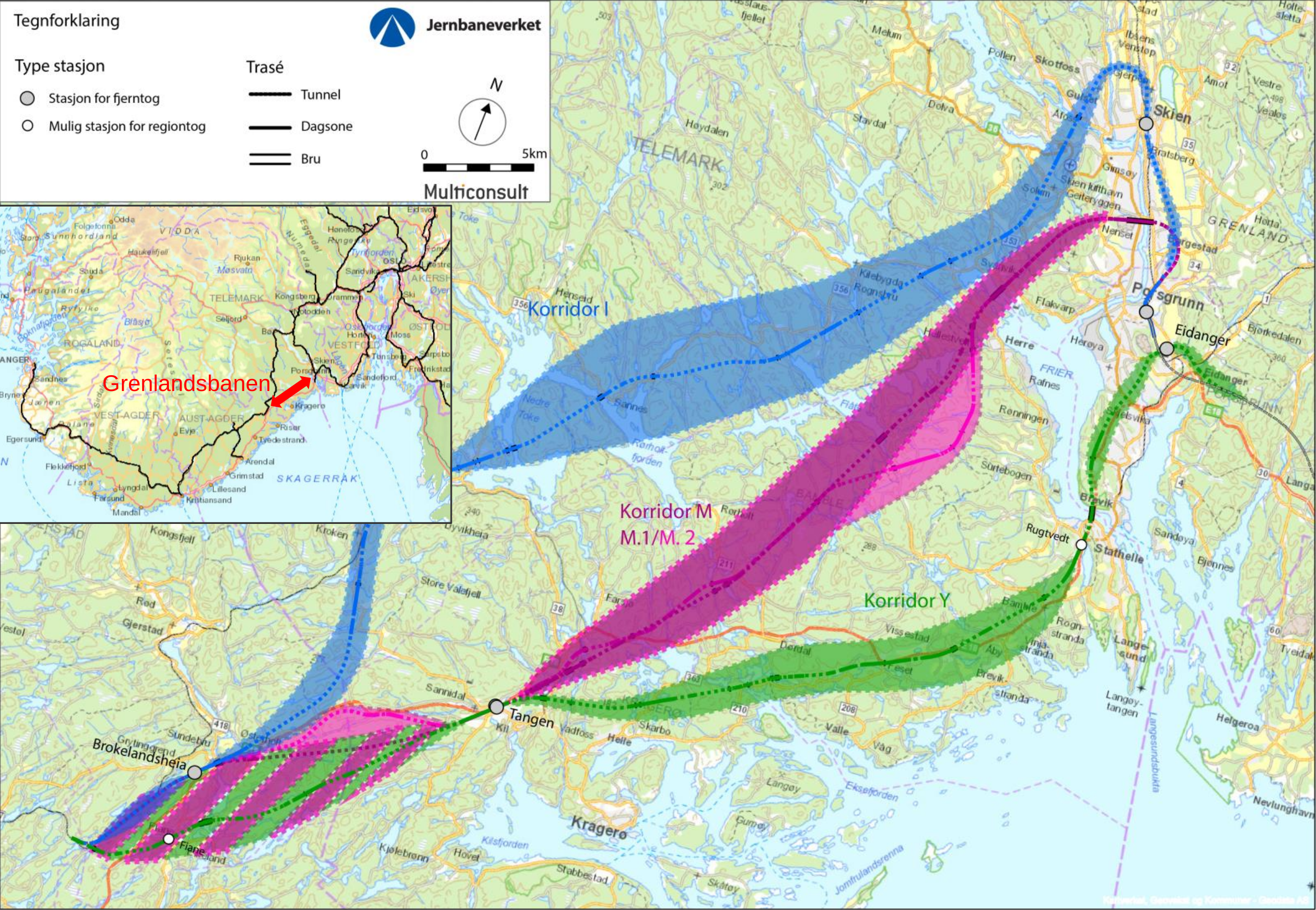

The Grenland Line (Norwegian: Grenlandsbanen) is a proposed high-speed railway line that would connect Grenland and Gjerstad in Norway. Specifically, the line would connect the Sørlandet Line at Skorstøl to the Vestfold Line at either Porsgrunn or Skien, allowing passenger trains from Stavanger and Kristiansand to be routed on the Vestfold Line through Grenland and Vestfold. The Grenland Line is proposed built with double track and with a speed of 250 km/h (160 mph). Three routes have been proposed, varying in length between 64 and 70 kilometers (40 and 43 mi). A prerequisite is that the Vestfold Line be upgraded to double track and high-speed, a process that started in the mid-1990s and which is scheduled for completion in 2032. A completion of the upgraded Vestfold Line and the Grenland Line would reduce travel time for passenger trains between Gjerstad and Oslo by about 70 minutes.

== History ==
The first section of the Sørlandet Line was completed from Drammen Station and Kongsberg Station in 1871. The Vestfold Line, between Drammen Station and Eidanger Station in Porsgrunn, was completed in 1882. The next step of railway construction along the southern coast could have been accomplished either by building from Kongsberg through Telemark to Kragerø, or a much shorter section from Porsgrunn to Kragerø. Parliament opted for the former in 1908, and the section to Kragerø was completed in 1927.

Later extensions of the Sørlandet Line largely continued through the interior, rather than following the more populated coast. The main arguments were that an interior line could be built with fewer tunnels – reducing costs – and that from a military point of view a non-coastal line would be safe from coastal bombardment from enemy battleships. As most of the population centers were on the coast, the various towns were proposed reached by branch lines. Compared to other Norwegian main railway lines, the Sørlandet Line as a large number of branch lines.

Renewed interest in connecting the Sørlandet Line and the Vestfold Line have been brought up in all the national railway plans and National Transport Plans since the 1920s. In 1949 two proposals were made, one from Skien to Lunde and one from Porsgrunn to Drangedal, but neither came further than the proposal stage.

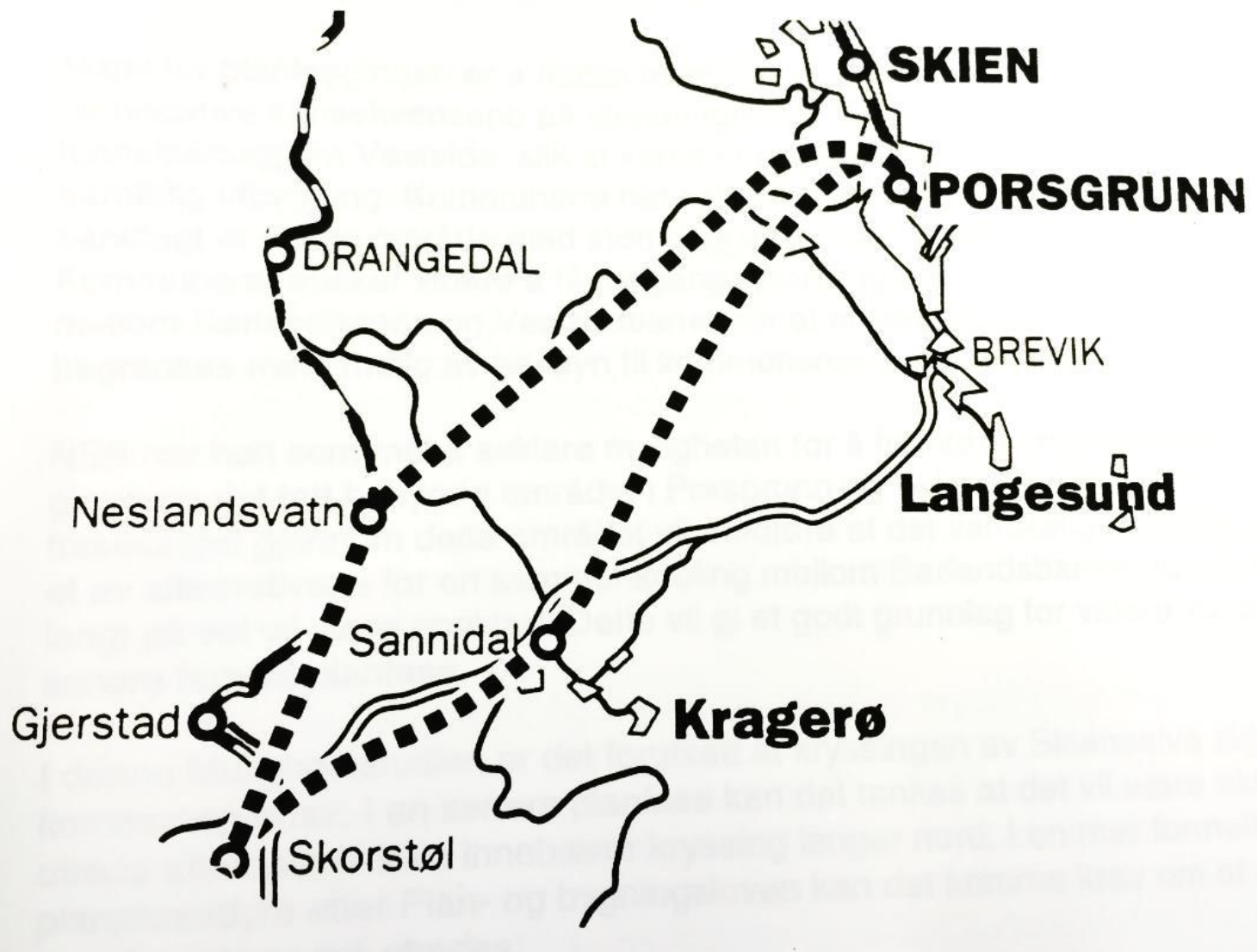
The Norwegian State Railway's 1995 map of proposals for the Grenland Line

The next major proposal came with the 1991 plans to modernize the Sørlandet Line, and resulted in several more specific plans. A 1995 recommended that a Grenland Line be built at some point during the 2000s, following one of two paths. Both started at Skorstøl Station on the Sørlandet Line, and then either ran via Sannidal outside Kragerø (outer route) or via Neslandsvatn Station on the same line (inner route) to link inn on the Vestfold Line north of Porsgrunn Station. More detailed analyzes were carried out in the following years. The inner route was eventually recommended as it could be built in several steps, overshadowing the outer route's advantage of passing through the more population area of Vestmar. Local governments have however included the planning of the outer route in their municipal plans. Railway Forum South was established in 1992 as a cooperation between the county municipalities of Rogaland, Vest-Agder, Aust-Agder, Telemark and Vestfold. The groups has been lobbying for a upgraded railway line along the entire coast from Oslo to Stavanger, which they call the Southwest Line, and has the Grenland Line as an important component.

Meanwhile plans were under way for upgrading the Vestfold Line. Work on the first section of new track began in 1993. Funding focused on upgrading the Vestfold Line, and the Grenland Line was never initialized. Plans for the Grenland Line were revitalized in 2014 and a concept selection study published in 2016.

== Premise ==
The Sørlandet Line west of Kongsberg and east of Egersund today consists of long-distance passenger and freight trains. For passenger traffic, both road and air are faster than by train. Stavanger and Kristiansand both have airports. As of 2016 road transport between Oslo and Kristiansand took 3 hours and 45 minutes, compared to between 4 hours and 30 minutes and 5 hours by train. Large sections of the E18 and E39 are scheduled to be upgraded to full freeway standards, which will result in further reduction of travel time by car. The Sørlandet Line largely bypasses any significant populations along the coast, and with the exception of Kongsberg does not pass through any significant urban areas until reaching Drammen. If trains were routed along the Vestfold Line, they would be able to stop at larger towns such as Porsgrunn, Larvik, Sandefjord and Tønsberg as well as Sandefjord Airport, Torp.

The Grenland Line will not make the route shorter, only faster and through more populated areas. Freight trains would therefore not use the line, although it could act as a bypass for freight trains in case of issues on the eastern part of the Sørlandet Line. The actual capacity of the Grenland Line will be based on bottlenecks on the Sørlandet and Vestfold Lines. The Sørlandet Line between Skorstøl and Kristiansand is single track and has a capacity of roughly two trains per hour. Allowing for freight trains, this will allow for one long-distance passenger train per hour. The capacity could be increased somewhat if some of the trains instead ran to Arendal, as they would then branch off on the Arendal Line.

== Proposed routes ==
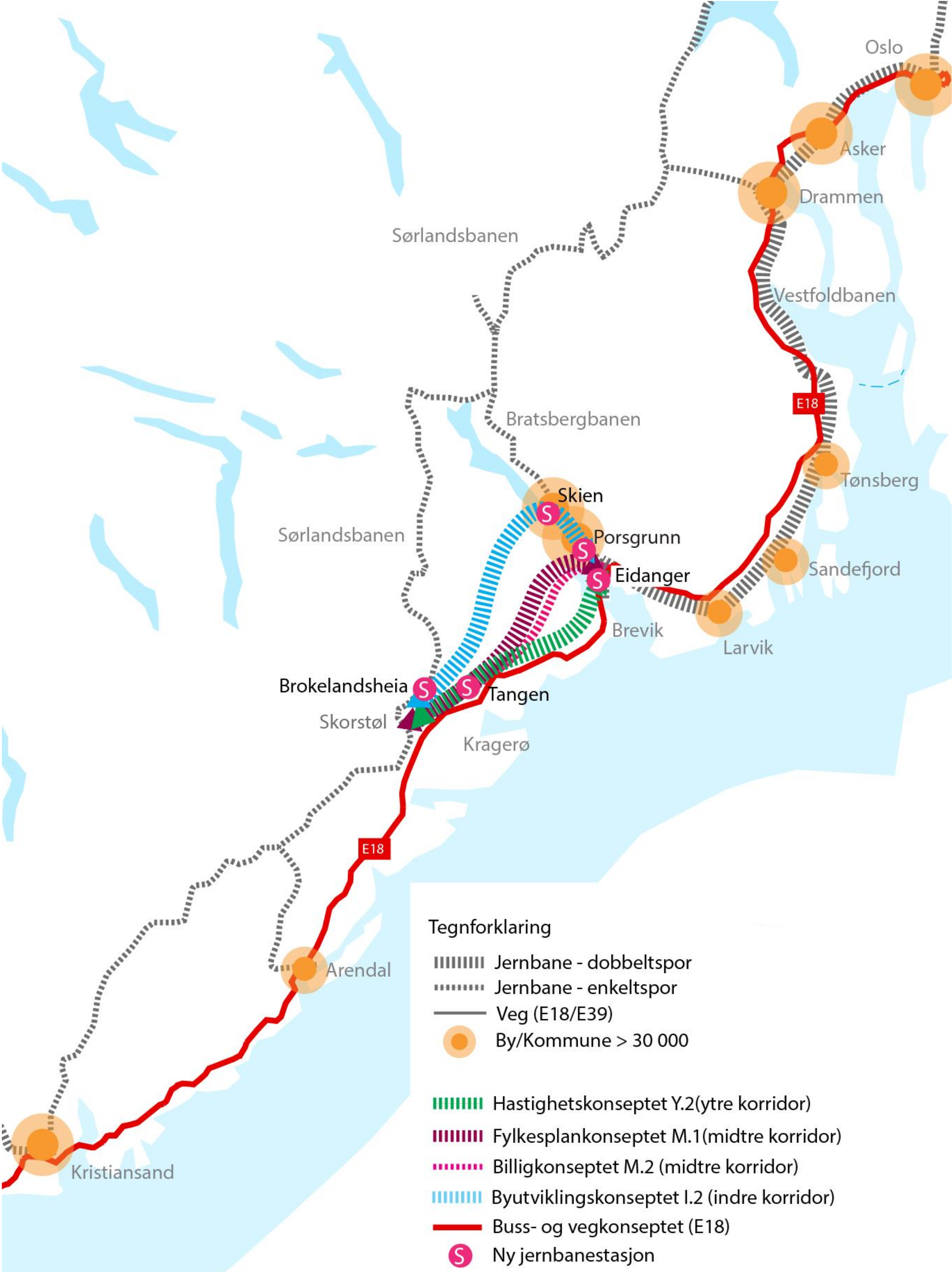
Map of proposals for the Grenland Line including neighboring lines

The 2016 concept selection study presented three possible main corridors for the Grenland Line. The southern-most would branch off from the Vestfold Line at Eidanger Municipality, where a new station would have to be built. Due to the new section of the Vestfold Line, regional trains would not be able to service this new station, located some 3 kilometers (2 mi) from the current station and town center of Porsgrunn. This route would cut south through southern Porsgrunn Municipality and Bamble Municipality, largely following the route of E18. The route could have a station serving Bamle at Rugtvedt. It would have an intermediate station at Sannidal/Tangen before intersecting with the Sørlandet Line at Skorstøl. This line would be 64 kilometers (40 mi) long, would cut travel time by 70 minutes and was estimated to cost 24.4 billion Norwegian kroner.

The central line would branch off the Vestfold Line just north of Porsgrunn Station. Due to curvatures, Porsgrunn Station would have to be moved to a point just south of the existing station. The line would cross the river Porsgrunnselva at Menstad, before crossing the inner parts of Vollsfjorden and then running south of Flåte. From Dørdal the line would more or less run on the south of E18 until Tangen. From there the central route would be the same as the southern alternative. This alternative would be 66 kilometers (41 mi) long, cut travel time by 68 minutes and cost 25.6 billion Norwegian kroner.

The northern-most proposal would see the Grenland Line branch off north of a new Skien Station, requiring the upgrade of the Bratsberg Line between Porsgrunn and Skien. The main advantage of this route is the railway could serve both Skien and Porsgrunn, and regional trains to Skien could continue along the Grenland Line. The line would cross the river Falkumelva and Farelva and then continues to Kilebygda north of Flåte. It would have to cross the northern part of Rørholtfjorden and Nedre Toke before intersecting the Sørlandet Line at Neslandsvatn. The final stretch would run through a new corridor from Neslandsvatn via a new station at Brokelandsheia before intersecting with the Sørlandet Line near Skorstøl. This alternative would be 77 kilometers (48 mi), reduce travel time by 59 minutes and cost 31.3 billion Norwegian kroner.

On the west side there have been two alternatives for a station, one at Sannidal/Tangen in Kragerø Municipality (but not within the town of Kragerø). The other is Brokelandsheia in Gjesdal. The reports from the 1990s had preferred a station at Brokelandsheia, while the 2016 report recommended that Sannidal be chosen as it was expected to have nearly three times as much ridership.
