= Drangedal =

Drangedal may refer to:

== Places ==
- Drangedal Municipality, a municipality in Telemark county, Norway
- Drangedal (village), a village in Drangedal Municipality in Telemark county, Norway
- Drangedal prestegjeld, a former geographic subdivision of the Church of Norway in Telemark county, Norway
- Drangedal Church, a church in Drangedal Municipality in Telemark county, Norway
- Drangedal Station, a railway station in Drangedal Municipality in Telemark county, Norway

== Other ==
- Drangedal IL, a sports club based in Drangedal Municipality in Telemark county, Norway
