= Timetoget =

Former Norwegian railway company

Timetoget Bratsbergbanen AS
- Type: Private
- Founded: 1998
- Defunct: 2000
- Fate: Liquidation
- Headquarters: Notodden, Norway
- Area served: Telemark
- Products: Bratsberg Line

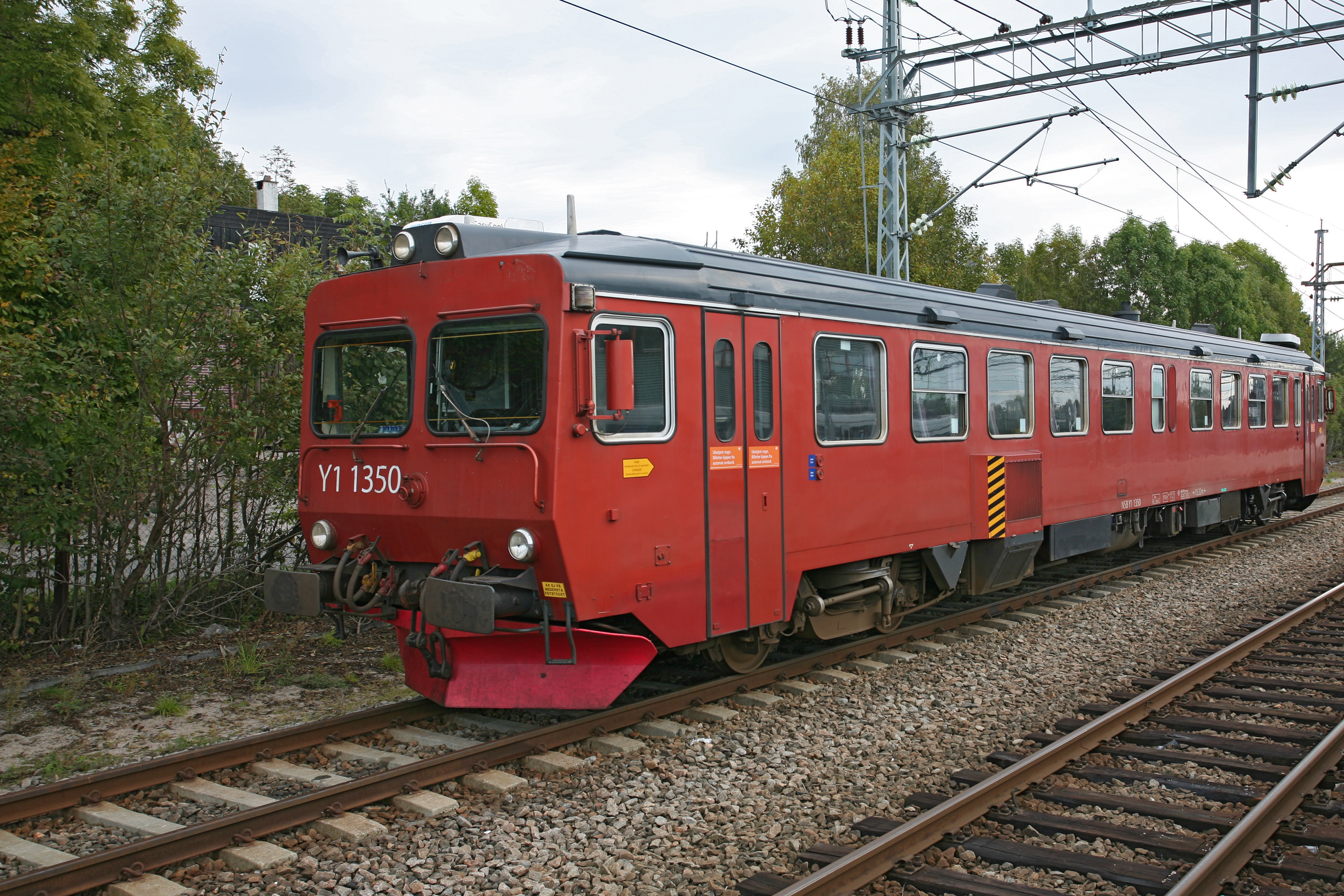
Y1 railcar at Skien Station

Timetoget Bratsbergbanen AS, trading as Timetoget ("the Hourly Train"), is a defunct railway company that tried to start operating passenger trains on the Bratsberg Line in Norway. The concept was launched in 1998, and in 1999 an agreement was made with the incumbent, Norwegian State Railways (NSB), to start operation in 2000. The founders were Gjermund Jamtveit and Halvor Grene, while NSB owned a third of the company. The company bought three used Y1 railcars from Sweden.

NSB soon bought all the shares of the company, and also made an agreement that operations on the Arendal Line would be taken over by Timetoget. However, the new company tried to take a short-cut in giving engineers only a six-week training program, instead of the usual 18 months. This made NSB want to discontinue operations. They bought out the rest of the shareholders, and liquidated the company. Timetoget never ran anything but trials on the Bratsberg Line.

== Establishment ==
The company was owned by NSB (34%), two individuals from Notodden, Gjermund Jamtveit and Halvor Grene (51%), Telemark County Municipality and some municipalities (15%). The trains would operate with a one-hour headway, twenty-four hours a day. It was the first private company allowed to operate passenger trains since the amalgamation of operations into the Norwegian State Railways. The concept was based on TIMEkspressen, an hourly coach service between Notodden and Oslo, that was operated by the Jamtveit and Grene-owned Øst-Telemark Automobilselskap. The company bought three used Y1 diesel railcars from SJ of Sweden, despite that the Bratsberg Line is electrified. The trains cost NOK 6 million each, and have a capacity of 70 passengers.

Initial plans called for operations to commence on 1 January 2000, but this soon proved difficult. In November, NSB paid out the other major shareholders, and were left with an 89% ownership of the company. The company needed dispensation from the Norwegian Labour Inspection Authority to allow temporary employments of engineers. When the company had announced the positions, only one engineer had applied for the twelve jobs. Instead an agreement was made with NSB to rent personnel, thus delaying the start until 3 September. But because the engineers needed to be recertified, the start was delayed again, to 5 November. In the end, Timetoget was forced to recruit and train new drivers. It received criticism for not having as extensive training as NSB, but the company stated that this would not affect safety. The labor union recommended its members not to apply for jobs with Timetoget, since they did not provide a pension agreement, collective bargaining or guarantees to return to NSB, should the concept fail.

In August, twelve engineers were hired on contract with Baneservice, at the time a subsidiary of the Norwegian National Rail Administration. The engineers were subsequently re-certified for the Y1 class, as well as being given a service course. While other engineers in the country are required to take an 18-month course, Timetoget felt it could meet sufficient safety standards with a six-week course. Arne Wam, chief executive officer of NSB, stated that he could not permit that a subsidiary ignore safety in such a way, and announced he would stop operations.

In August 2000, Timetoget offered Telemark County Municipality to take over the transport of school children between Drangedal Station and Nordagutu Station. In September, the company also started negotiations with NSB to take over services on the Arendal Line, but it was stated that this was not excepted by NSB.

== Disestablishment ==
The first trial with the Y1 railcars was performed on 1 August 2000. The one unit was not able to complete the route due to technical problems, but the other train was able to. Terje Bulling, the CEO of Timetoget, stated that he was aiming for 140,000 passengers in 2001, but was worried because NSB, due to lack of engineers, was driving passengers with by taxi between Notodden Station and Nordagutu. On 5 October, Vidar Østreng, vice president in NSB and chairman of Timetoget, announced that NSB, due to lack of engineers, would have to reduce the production of train services. He indicated that the least profitable routes, including the Bratsberg Line, would be closed. At the same time, NSB said one possibility could be that they sold their 89% stake in the company, thereby bypassing NSB's rules for engineer training. Five days later, the engineers in NSB stated that they would not operate trains between Larvik Station and Skien, and Kongsberg Station and Bø Station, if Timetoget was allowed to operate. These sections of the Vestfold Line and Sørlandet Line, respectively, are shared with the Bratsberg Line. The engineers considered lack of sufficient training such a safety risk that it would not be secure to operate on the lines. At the same time, NSB announced that they would stop operating trains on the Bratsberg Line from 20 October.

Timetoget started negotiations with the Swedish company BK Tåg to try to establish a cooperation that would allow Swedish engineers to be used. At the same time, the minority shareholders, who owned 11% of the company, demanded that they could take over NSB's shares without compensation, and that all debt to NSB be deleted. Arne Wam responded by stating that NSB wanted to liquidate the company. NSB therefore offered to purchase all shares in the company at par value, despite the company not having any net assets.

By 2 November, all owners, except the two environmental organizations, the Norwegian Society for the Conservation of Nature and Nature and Youth, had sold their shares to NSB. The two environmental organizations owned 7 of the company's 40,000 shares. At the general meeting the same day, the company was liquidated, even though the two organizations opposed the move. Prior to the meeting, the other minority owners had held a tactics meeting to discuss what to do. Several municipalities were concerned that they would lose even more money if they did not sell. The other minority owners agreed to cover the costs of the two environmental organizations, and let them make the principal stand to oppose the liquidation.

== Aftermath ==
By 14 November, the concept had been approved by the Norwegian Railway Inspectorate. Following the announcement, Wam stated that NSB would continue to operate the service, and use the Timetoget concept. An internal document the newspaper Varden received access to showed that NSB needed to calm down the heated discussions with the labor unions, and that their negativity to Timetoget was a tactical move to satisfy the labor unions. Minister of Transport, Terje Moe Gustavsen from the Labour Party, stated in a meeting with two parliamentarians from Telemark, that he would allow a new private company, without NSB ownership, to operate the line.

In January 2001, Connex Norge offered to purchase Timetoget from NSB, and start operations. However, by February, Connex had changed their mind, and no longer wanted to purchase the company. Terje Bulling admitted that Timetoget had a very good agreement for operating the Arendal Line, and that a fourth Y1 railcar had been bought from Sweden for this route. However, when NSB had tried to sell Timetoget, this agreement was not part of the estate. By April, NSB estimated that they had lost NOK 10 million on their engagement in Timetoget. However, they had three Y1 trains, and would be able to start using them on the Bratsberg Line and the Arendal Line.
