= Neslandsvatn Station =

Railway station in Drangedal, Norway

Neslandsvatn
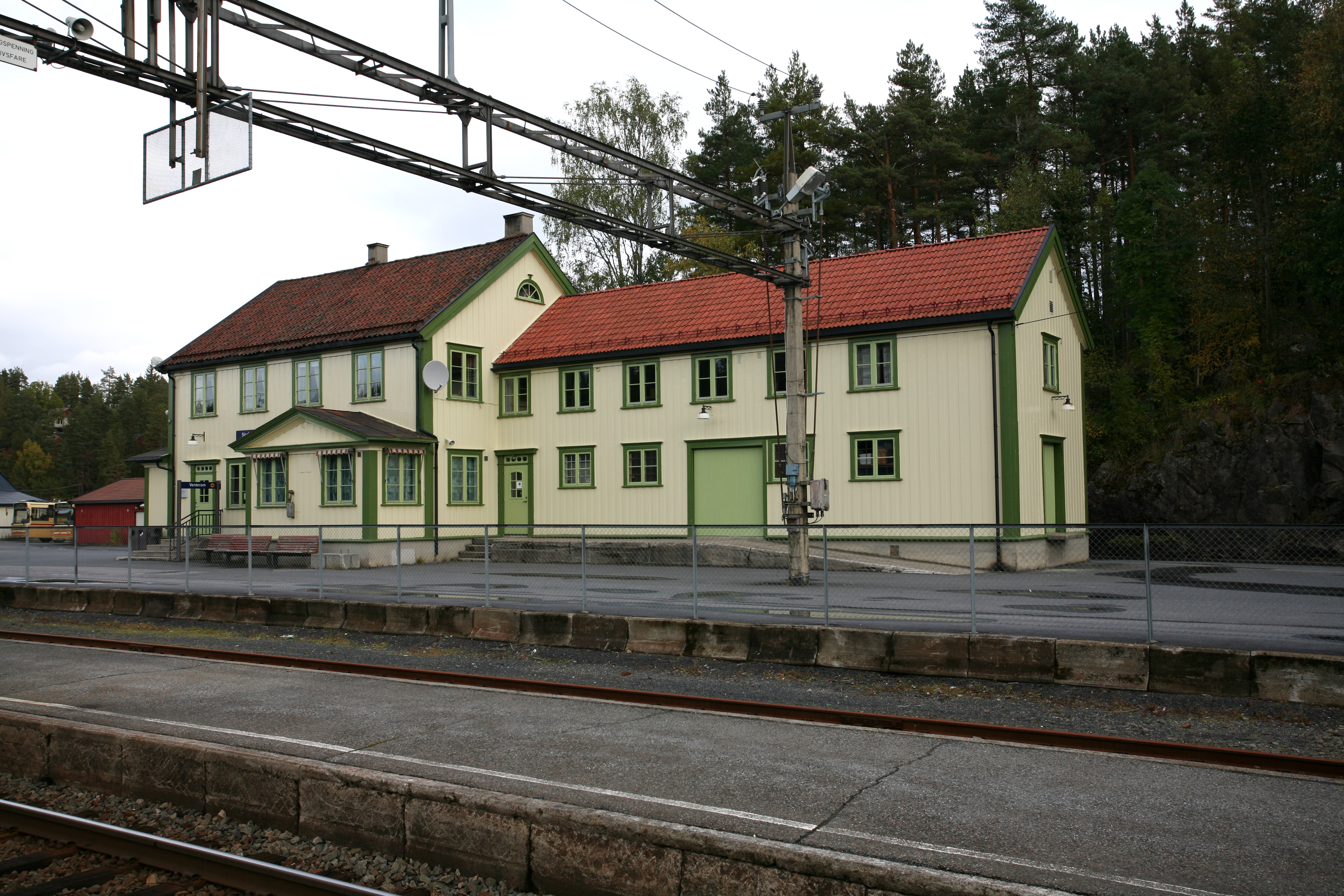

General information
- Location: Neslandsvatn, Drangedal Municipality; Norway
- Coordinates: 58°58′16″N 9°09′22″E
- Elevation: 72.6 m (238 ft)
- Owner: Bane NOR
- Operator: Go-Ahead Norge
- Line: Sørlandet Line
- Distance: 220.76 km (137.17 mi)

Other information
- Station code: NVT

History
- Opened: 2 December 1927
Location

Neslandsvatn Station (Norwegian: Neslandsvatn stasjon) is a railway station on the Sørlandet Line located in Neslandsvatn in Drangedal Municipality, Norway. The station is served by express trains to Kristiansand and Oslo.

== History ==
The station was opened on 2 December 1927 when the Sørland Line opened to Kragerø Station. In 1935, the Sørland Line was extended to Arendal Station, while the line to Kragerø was transformed to the Kragerø Line. This line was closed in 1989 and passengers are now transport the 27 kilometres (17 mi) by coach.

| Preceding station | Express trains | Following station |
|---|---|---|
| Gjerstad towards Stavanger | F5 | Drangedal towards Oslo S |
