= Otto Fabricius =

Danish missionary and scientist

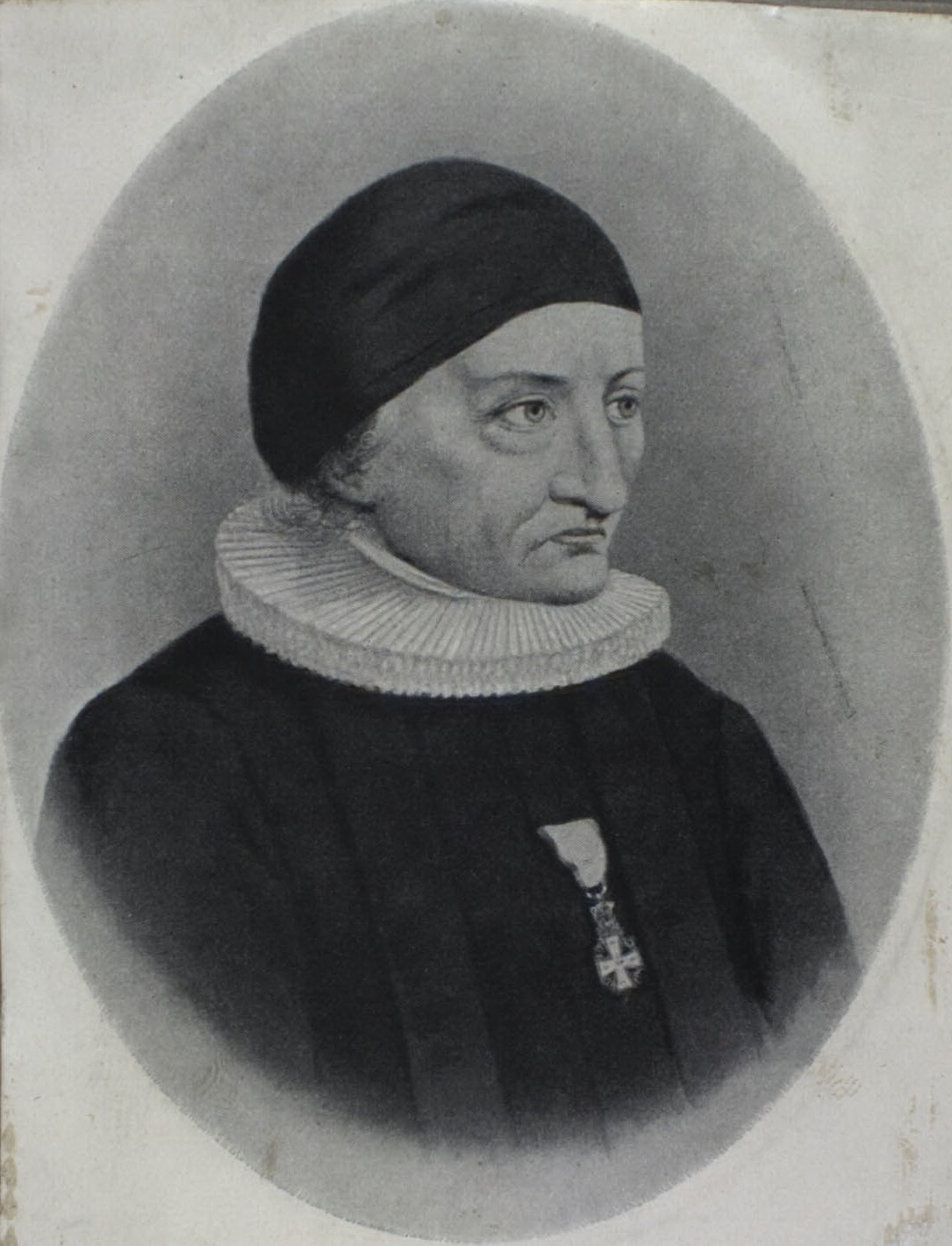
- Born: 6 March 1744; Rudkøbing, Denmark
- Died: 20 May 1822 (aged 78); Copenhagen, Denmark
- Occupations: Missionary, naturalist, ethnographer, and explorer
- Notable work: Fauna Groenlandica (1780)
- Scientific career
- Education: Greenland Mission Seminary
- Known for: Cataloging 473 animal species, primarily marine, 130 of which were proposed as new to science, in Greenland
- Fields: Ethnography, naturalism
- Author abbrev. (zoology): O. Fabricius
- Years active: 1768-1822

Ecclesiastical career
- Religion: Christianity
- Church: Church of Denmark
- Congregations served: Christianshavn; Drangedal; Tørrisdal; Nedre Telemark
- Title: Honorary Bishop

Otto Fabricius (6 March 1744 – 20 May 1822) was a Danish missionary, naturalist, ethnographer, and explorer of Greenland.

== Biography ==
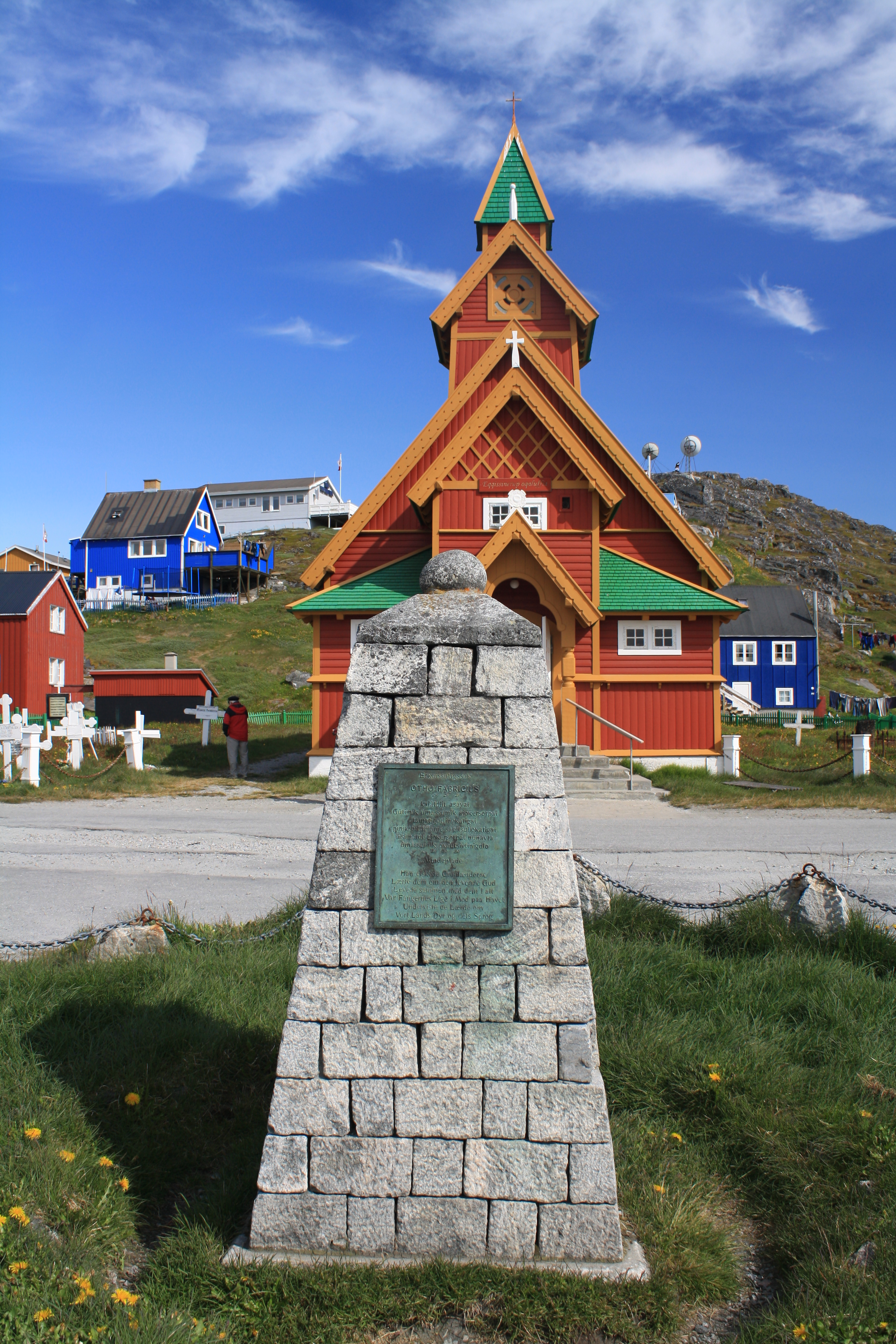
Memorial plaque in Paamiut, Greenland. Text in Greenlandic and Danish: "He loved the Greenlanders; Taught them about the living God; Lived with them in everything; Was the hunters' equal in courage on the sea; Taught the scholars about the animals and language of our country"

Otto Fabricius was born in Rudkøbing on the island of Langeland, Denmark, where his father was a rector. In his youth, he was educated largely at home by tutors. In 1762, he was matriculated at the University of Copenhagen. In 1765, he was admitted to the Greenland Mission Seminary (Seminarium Groenlandicum), where he attended classes taught by Poul Egede. In 1768 he graduated with a degree in divinity.

He was sent as a missionary to the southwestern coast of Greenland from 1768 to 1773. During this period, he made enormous amounts of observations and collections. His laboratory was an Inuit house made of turf. His only artificial light was an oil lamp. He had a few magnifying glasses and only one book was in his library, Linnaei Systema Naturae by Carl Linnaeus. Nevertheless, he made enough zoological observation to be able to publish Fauna Groenlandica (1780), which was written in Latin, after his return to Denmark. Here, he described 473 animal species, primarily marine, 130 of which were proposed as new to science. Detailed descriptions are given, including information on habitat and behaviour, the vernacular Inuit name, what use the Inuit make of the animal and not least how they caught or trapped it.

In 1774, he was appointed rector at Drangedal Church in Telemark, Norway where he stayed until 1779 while he completed work for a Greenlandic language dictionary which was published in 1804. In 1789, he succeeded Poul Egede to become a lecturer in the Greenland Mission Seminary. In 1818, he was appointed an Honorary Bishop of the Church of Denmark and awarded a Doctorate of Divinity.

His great-great-granddaughter is the singer Oh Land.

== Fauna Groenlandica ==
- Fauna Groenlandica by Othonis Fabricii (1780) was published in Latin by Göttingen Niedersächsische Staats- und Universitätsbibliothek Hafniae; Lipsiae Rothe. Scan
- Sections on mammals and birds translated from Latin into Danish by O. Helms (1929): Otto Fabricius, Fauna Groenlandica, Pattedyr og Fugle, Det Grønlandske Selskabs Skrifter
- The life of Bishop Otto Fabricius is reviewed and the section on seals translated and commented on by Finn O. Kapel (2005): Otto Fabricius and the seals of Greenland. MoG Bioscience.

== Other sources ==
- Jensen, A.S. (1932) Otto Fabricius, pp. 72–75 in: Meisen, V. Prominent Danish Scientists through the Ages (Copenhagen: Levin & Munksgaard)
- Kapel, Finn O. (2005) Otto Fabricius and the seals of Greenland (Copenhagen: Museum Tusculanum Press) ISBN 87-90369-77-7
