= Neslandsvatn =

Village in Drangedal Municipality, Norway

Neslandsvatn Nesland
- Village
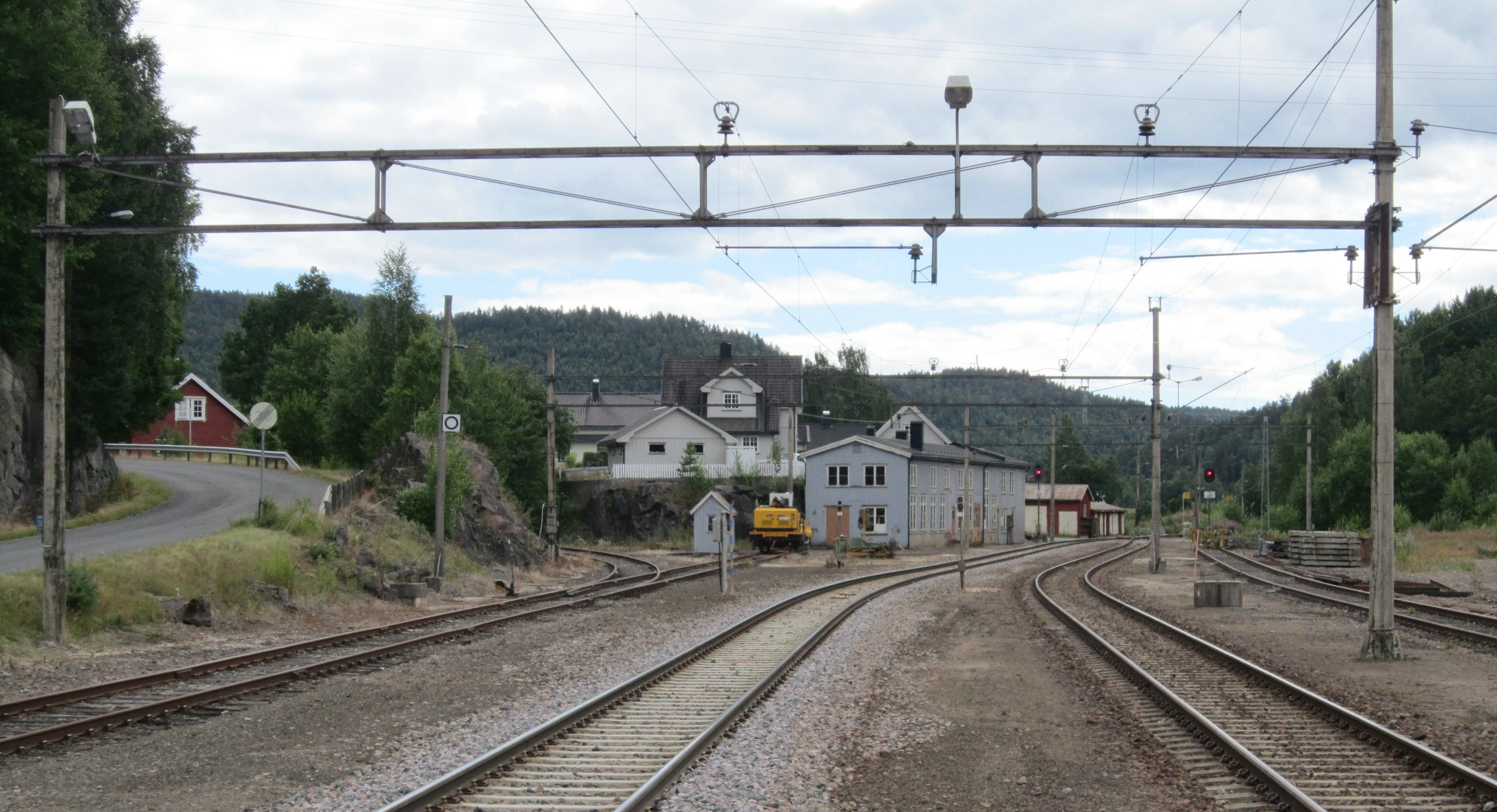
- View of the village railway station
- Interactive map of Neslandsvatn
- Coordinates: 58.97134°N 9.15626°E
- Country: Norway
- Region: Eastern Norway
- County: Telemark
- District: Grenland
- Municipality: Drangedal Municipality

Area
  - Total: 0.34 km^{2} (0.13 sq mi)
- Elevation: 76 m (249 ft)

Population (2025)
  - Total: 288
  - Density: 847/km^{2} (2,190/sq mi)
- Time zone: UTC+01:00 (CET)
  - Summer (DST): UTC+02:00 (CEST)
- Post Code: 3760 Neslandsvatn

Neslandsvatn is a village in Drangedal Municipality in Telemark county, Norway. The village is located along the small lake Neslandsvatnet, about 16 kilometres (9.9 mi) to the southeast of the village of Prestestranda. The village of Henseid is located about 12 kilometres (7.5 mi) to the northeast, across the large lake Toke. Kroken Church is located about 3 kilometres (1.9 mi) to the southwest of the village.

The 0.34-square-kilometre (84-acre) village has a population (2025) of 288 and a population density of 847 inhabitants per square kilometre (2,190/sq mi).

The village has a station on the Sørlandsbanen railway line. It is also a popular skiing and snowboarding area.
