= Kroken Church (Telemark) =

Church in Telemark, Norway

- Kroken kyrkje
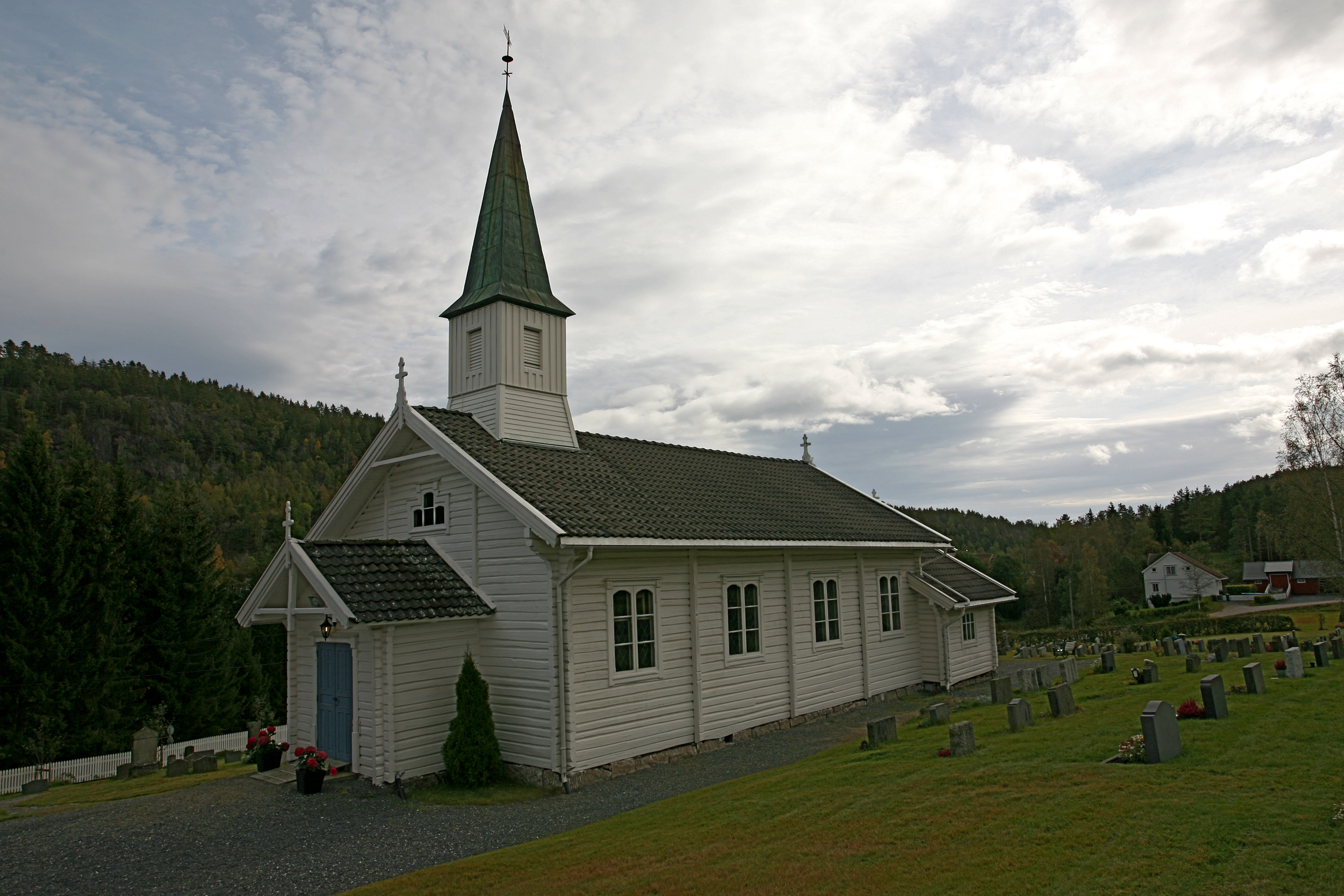
- View of the church
- Kroken Church
- 58°56′40″N 9°07′58″E
- Location: Drangedal Municipality, Telemark
- Country: Norway
- Denomination: Church of Norway
- Churchmanship: Evangelical Lutheran

History
- Former name: Kroken kapell
- Status: Parish church
- Founded: 1910
- Consecrated: 24 February 1910

Architecture
- Functional status: Active
- Architect: Victor Nordan
- Architectural type: Long church
- Completed: 1910 (116 years ago)

Specifications
- Capacity: 155
- Materials: Wood

Administration
- Diocese: Agder og Telemark
- Deanery: Bamble prosti
- Parish: Kroken
- Norwegian Cultural Heritage Site
- Type: Church
- Status: Not protected
- ID: 84843

Kroken Church (Norwegian: Kroken kyrkje) is a parish church of the Church of Norway in Drangedal Municipality in Telemark county, Norway. It is located in the village of Kroken. It is the church for the Kroken parish which is part of the Bamble prosti (deanery) in the Diocese of Agder og Telemark. The white, wooden church was built in a long church design in 1910 using plans drawn up by the architect Victor Nordan. The church seats about 155 people.

== History ==
As early as the middle of the 18th century, there was a desire among the local population for an annex chapel in Kroken because of the long and winding road to the parish church, Drangedal Church. It took some time, but the first step towards this was the building of a local cemetery in the 1830s. The cemetery was used locally, but it was not formally consecrated until 11 November 1869. Work towards gaining a chapel in Kroken continued. In the early 1900s, Victor Nordan was hired to design the new chapel building. The local parish relied on a combination of collected funds, loans, grants, and free volunteer labour to get the project approved. In 1909, the new Kroken Chapel was built by builder W.H. Kjønnaas. The new building was consecrated by the Bishop Kristian Vilhelm Koren Schjelderup Sr. on 24 February 1910. The building had a rectangular nave with a smaller chancel and sacristy on the south end of the building. A church porch and bell tower is located on the north end. Problems arose early on with the new building. The tower on the roof had to be repaired as early as the third winter, and the roof had to be re-roofed in 1917. There have been many repairs over the years. After the war, the spire fell down and the roof was leaking, so they had to be repaired. There were renovations in the 1940s (up to 1949–1950) which is also when the church got its stained glass windows. In 1982 the church was broken into and vandalized. In the late-1980s the interior was renovated. During this project the pews were taken out and chairs put in instead, which slightly reduced the number of seats in the building. On 1 January 1988, Kroken Chapel was granted parish church status and it was renamed as Kroken Church. The church was long considered too small, and expansion was discussed for a long time, but hindered by architectural problems. In 2013, the church was expanded by removing the old church porch in the north and extending the nave under the bell tower. A new church porch was also built to the north of the newly enlarged nave.

== See also ==
- List of churches in Agder og Telemark
