= Henseid =

Village in Drangedal Municipality, Norway

Henseid Henneseid
- Village
- Interactive map of the village
- Coordinates: 59.06199°N 9.19828°E
- Country: Norway
- Region: Eastern Norway
- County: Telemark
- District: Grenland
- Municipality: Drangedal Municipality
- Elevation: 68 m (223 ft)
- Time zone: UTC+01:00 (CET)
  - Summer (DST): UTC+02:00 (CEST)
- Post Code: 3750 Drangedal

Henseid is a village in Drangedal Municipality in Telemark county, Norway. The village is located on the north shore of the lake Toke, about 12 kilometres (7.5 mi) to the southeast of the village of Prestestranda.
