= Nils Tore Føreland =

Norwegian politician (born 1957)

Nils Tore Føreland (born 26 July 1957) is a Norwegian politician for the Labour Party.

He served as a deputy representative to the Parliament of Norway from Telemark during the terms 1981–1985, 1985–1989 and 1993–1997. In total he met during 19 days of parliamentary session. On the local level Føreland served as mayor of Drangedal Municipality from 2003 to 2011, having formerly been a member of Telemark county council for eight years. He combined the position as mayor with a job at an oil platform in the North Sea.

He has been a deputy board member of the Norwegian State Housing Bank.
