= Drangedal Station =

Railway station in Drangedal, Norway

Drangedal
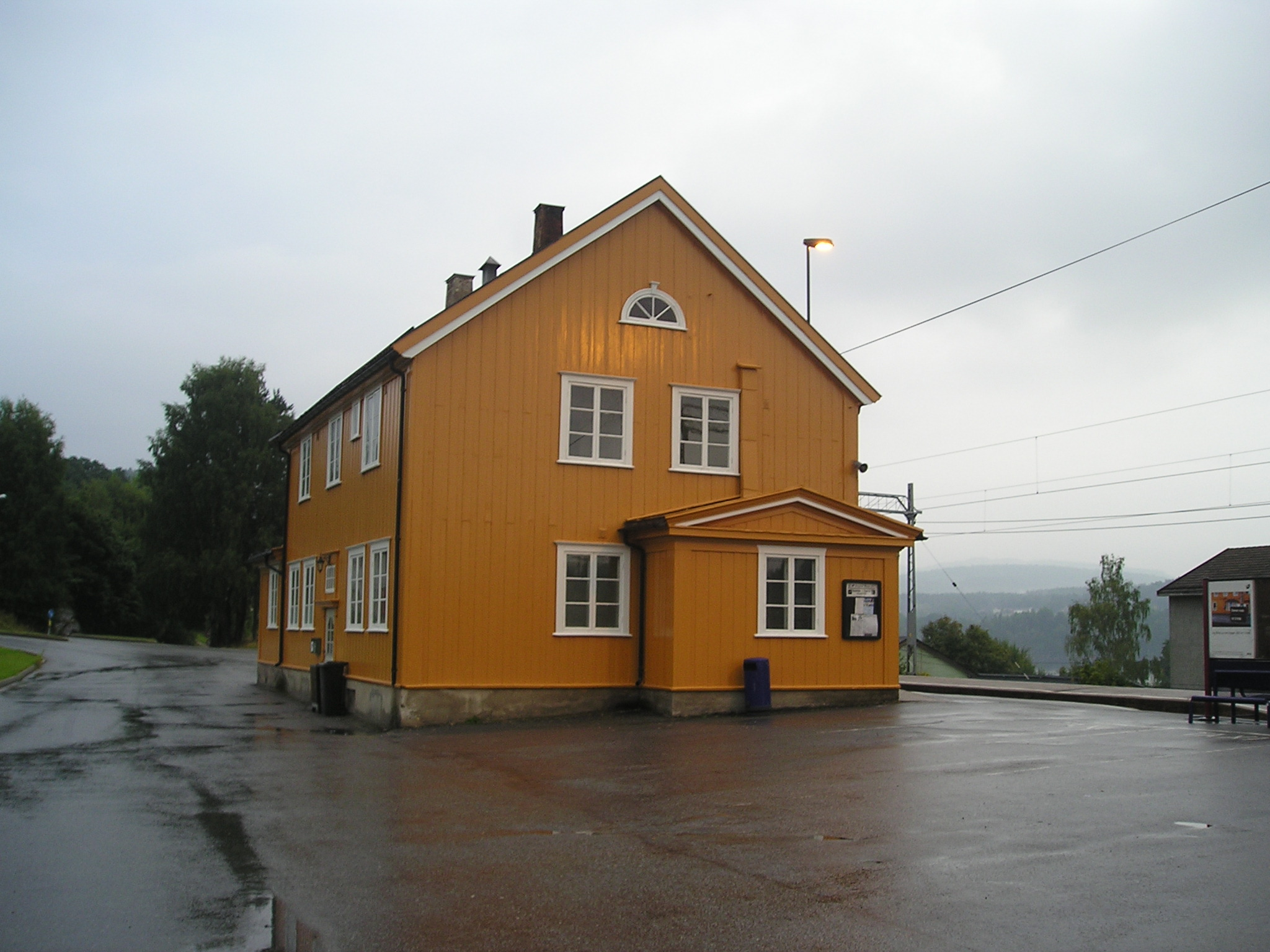

General information
- Location: Prestestranda, Drangedal Municipality; Norway
- Coordinates: 59°5′47.66″N 9°3′57.62″E
- Elevation: 75.7 m (248 ft) AMSL
- Owner: Bane NOR
- Operator: Go-Ahead Norge
- Line: Sørlandet Line
- Distance: 204.96 km (127.36 mi)
- Platforms: 2
- Connections: Bus service

Other information
- Station code: DRD
- IATA code: ZVD
Location

Drangedal Station (Norwegian: Drangedal stasjon) is a railway station on the Sørlandet Line located in Prestestranda in Drangedal Municipality, Norway. The station is served by express trains to Kristiansand and Oslo.

== History ==
The station was opened in 1927 when Sørlandet Line was opened to Kragerø Station.

Preceding station	Express trains	Following station
Neslandsvatn towards Stavanger	F5	Lunde towards Oslo S
