= Andrew Gulickson =

American politician

Andrew Gulickson (December 18, 1856 – April 29, 1941) was a member of the Wisconsin State Assembly.

Gulickson was born at Drangedal Municipality in Telemark county, Norway. He moved to the United States during 1868 with his parents. Gulickson was a member of the Assembly from 1911 to 1913. He was a Republican. He died in 1941.
