= Nettbuss Telemark =

Norwegian bus company

Nettbuss Telemark AS
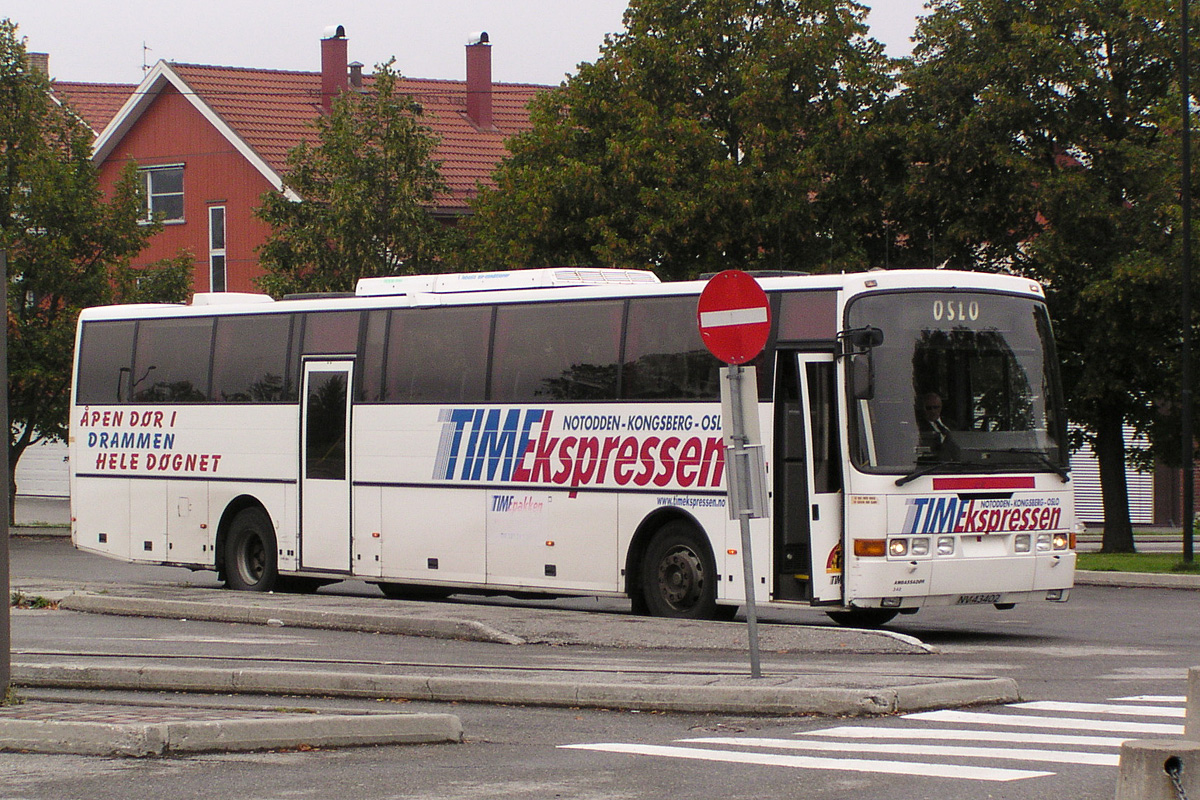
- One of the original TIMEkspressen coaches in 2006
- Parent: Nettbuss (since 1998)
- Founded: June 26, 1908 in Sauland, Norway by Torgrim M. Kleppen
- Defunct: 2005
- Headquarters: Notodden, Norway
- Service area: Hjartdal Municipality; Notodden Municipality; Sauherad Municipality

Øst-Telemark Automobilselskap AS (ØTA) was a bus company based in Notodden, Norway. It was taken over by NSB Biltrafikk on 1 May 1998, and was renamed Nettbuss Telemark AS in 2000. In 2005 it was merged into Nettbuss Drammen.

On 4 August 1997, it launched the TIMEkspressen hourly coach service from Notodden to Oslo. Nettbuss later made this a national brand for its hourly intercity coach services. In 1998, the company's owners, Gjermund Jamtveit and Halvor Grene, also started the train company TIMEtoget, that attempted to operate the Bratsberg Line on a similar, hourly concept.
