= Timekspressen =

Norwegian coach service brand

Nettbuss TIMEkspressen
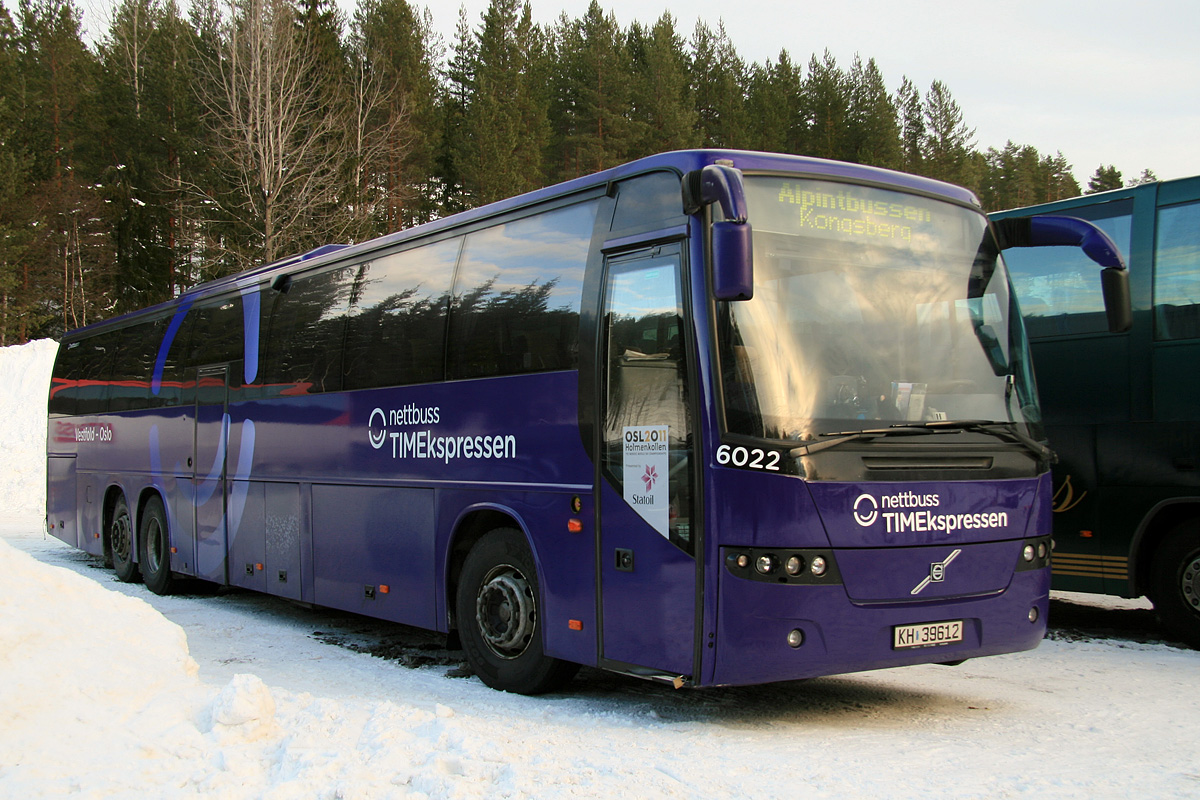
- A Volvo 9700S coach in the 2011 livery.
- Commenced operation: 4 August 1997
- Ceased operation: 13 May 2018
- Service area: Norway
- Service type: Intercity coach service
- Hubs: Oslo
- Fleet: Volvo 9700
- Operator: Nettbuss

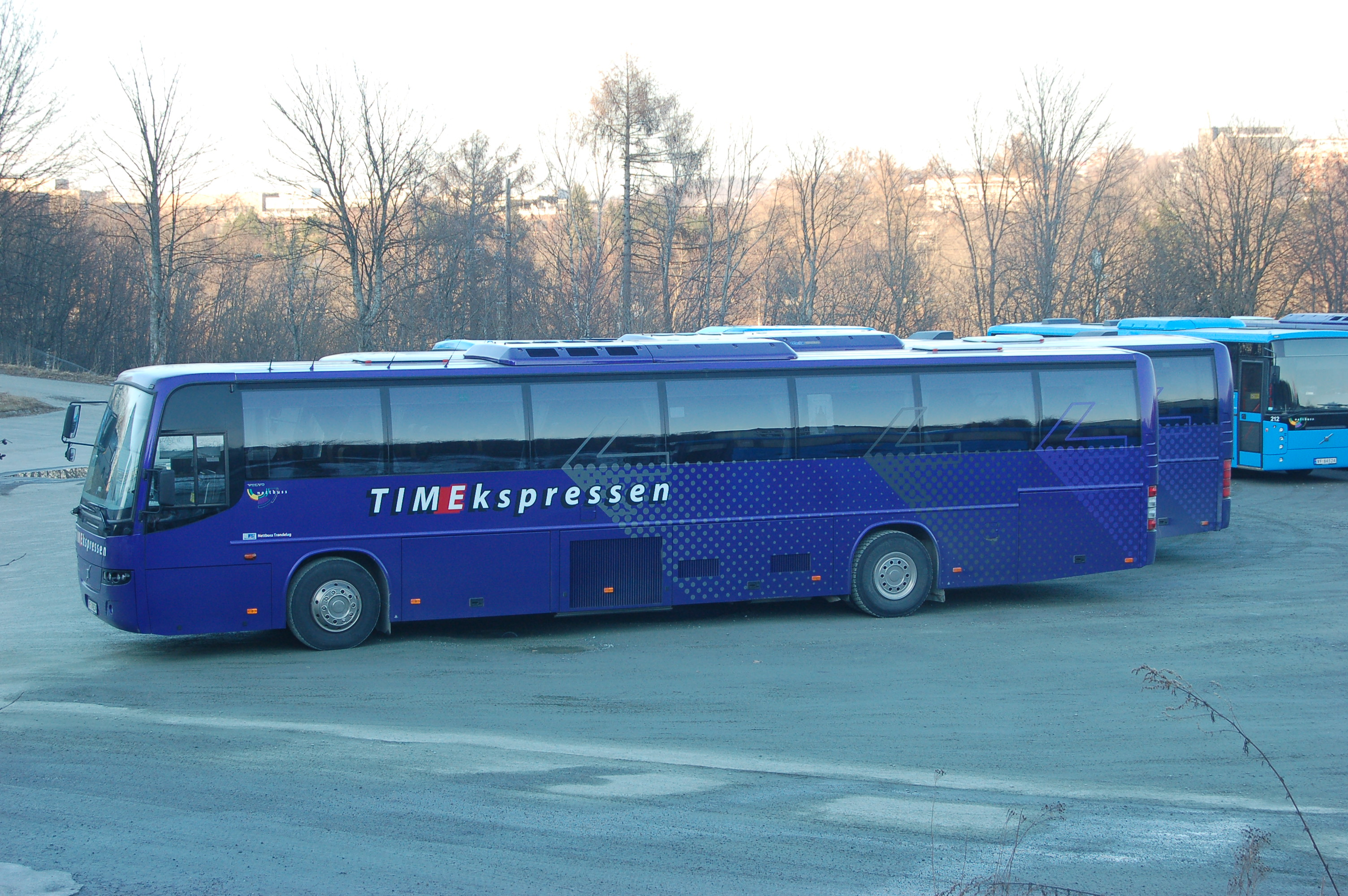
A coach in TIMEkspressen's livery from 2002 to 2010.

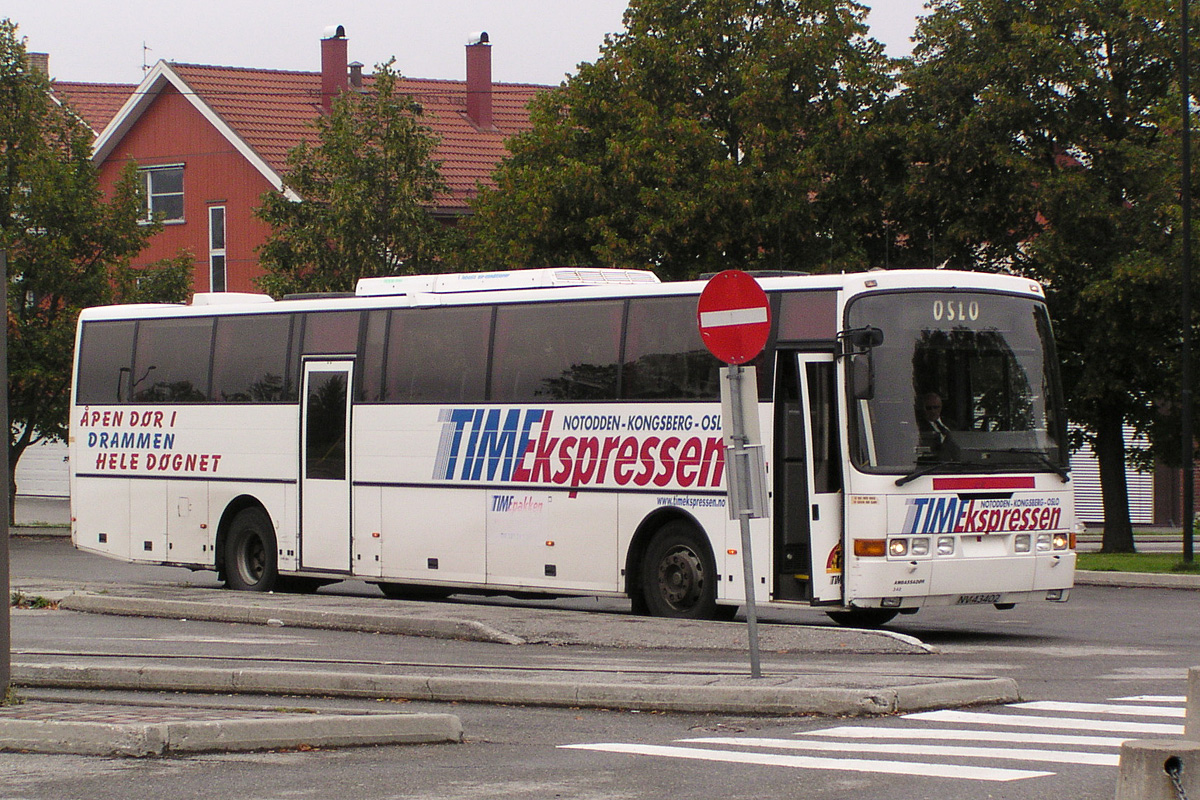
A coach in approximately the original livery from 1997, here on a local route in 2006.

TIMEkspressen (lit. '"Hourly Express"' in Norwegian) was an intercity coach brand used by Nettbuss on several routes in Norway. The coaches were usually operated at one hour headway, but some routes had higher frequency in rush hour and lower frequency in the weekends.

Several of the routes operated as TIMEkspressen competed directly with commuter and regional trains run by Nettbuss' owner, the Norwegian State Railways, including on the Kongsvinger Line, the Randsfjord Line, the Trøndelag Commuter Rail, the Vestfold Line and the Østfold Line.

== History ==
The brand was originally started by Øst-Telemark Automobilselskap in 1997 through the company TIMEkspressen Telemark on the route Notodden–Kongsberg–Oslo. In 1998, Nettbuss bought both companies and started developing the brand on other areas served by Nettbuss. At its peak in 2011, there were fourteen routes. By 2018, only four routes remained. On 14 May 2018, the last routes were transferred to the Nettbuss express brand.

== Routes ==
From May 2013, route numbers were preceded by letters "TE". Only major intermediate stops are mentioned.

Number	Route	Start date	End date	Notes and history
TE1	Notodden - Kongsberg - Drammen - Oslo	4 August 1997	7 January 2018	24-hour service from 16 March 1998; No longer 24-hour service from 3 September 2012; Rebranded as Nettbuss express route NX1 from 8 January 2018
TE2	Kongsvinger - Oslo	August 1998	30 April 2016	
TE3	Sarpsborg - Moss - Oslo	April 2002	13 May 2018	Rebranded as Nettbuss express route NX3 from 14 May 2018
TE4	Hønefoss - Oslo	19 August 2002	30 June 2015	Replaced by Brakar route 200 from 1 July 2015
5	Berger – Svelvik – Drammen – Oslo	19 August 2002	20 December 2003	
TE5	Arendal – Kristiansand	24 January 2005	November 2013	
6	Stjørdal – Trondheim	August 1999	17 August 2008	Replaced by route 12
TE6	Hvaler - Fredrikstad - Råde - Oslo	4 November 2008	13 May 2018	Former Oslofjordekspressen (NOR-WAY); Rebranded as Nettbuss express route NX6 from 14 May 2018
7	Støren – Melhus – Trondheim	21 October 2002	17 August 2008	
7	Åsgårdstrand – Horten – Holmestrand – Drammen – Oslo	19 September 2011	December 2012	
TE8	Tjøme – Tønsberg – Oslo	11 November 2002	4 January 2015	
TE9	Mysen - Askim - Oslo	20 January 2003	22 June 2014	
TE10	Vikersund – Drammen – Oslo	15 August 2005	31 December 2014	Replaced by Brakar route 100 between Vikersund and Drammen from 2 January 2015
TE11	Volda - Ålesund - Molde - Kristiansund	1 May 2005	31 December 2015	
12	Orkanger – Trondheim	22 August 2005	17 August 2008	Replaced by new route 12
12	Stjørdal – Trondheim – Fannrem	18 August 2008	31 December 2011	
TE14	Stavern - Larvik - Sandefjord - Oslo	16 January 2006	27 September 2015	Rebranded as Nettbuss express route NX14 from 28 September 2015
TE15	Gjøvik - Skreia - Oslo Airport, Gardermoen - Oslo	1 May 2008	30 April 2017	Former Totenekspressen (NOR-WAY); Rebranded as Nettbuss express route NX15 from 1 May 2017
