= Prestestranda =

Village in Drangedal Municipality, Norway

Prestestranda Preststranda Drangedal
- Village
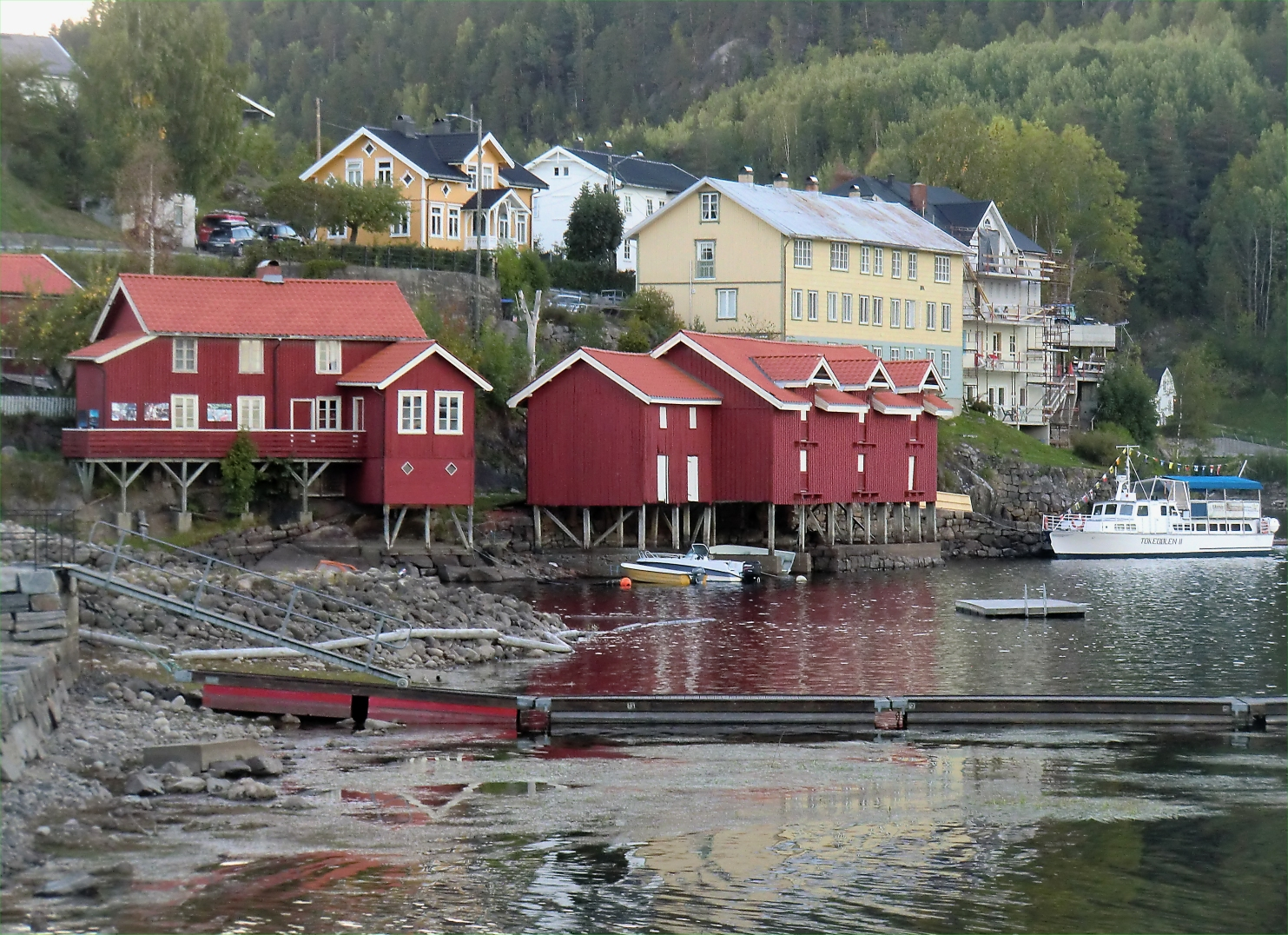
- View of the village along the lake shore
- Interactive map of the village
- Coordinates: 59.09744°N 9.05879°E
- Country: Norway
- Region: Eastern Norway
- County: Telemark
- Municipality: Drangedal Municipality

Area
  - Total: 1.62 km^{2} (0.63 sq mi)
- Elevation: 75 m (246 ft)

Population (2025)
  - Total: 1,339
  - Density: 827/km^{2} (2,140/sq mi)
- Time zone: UTC+01:00 (CET)
  - Summer (DST): UTC+02:00 (CEST)
- Post Code: 3750 Drangedal

Prestestranda is the administrative centre of Drangedal Municipality in Telemark county, Norway. The village is located at the northwestern end of the lake Øvre Toke, about 12 kilometres (7.5 mi) to the southeast of the village of Bostrak and about 12 kilometres (7.5 mi) to the northwest of the village of Henseid. Drangedal Church is located in the village.

The 1.62-square-kilometre (400-acre) village has a population (2025) of 1,339 and a population density of 827 inhabitants per square kilometre (2,140/sq mi).

A railway station along the Sørlandsbanen railway line was built in the village in 1927.
