= Toke (lake) =

Lake in Telemark, Norway

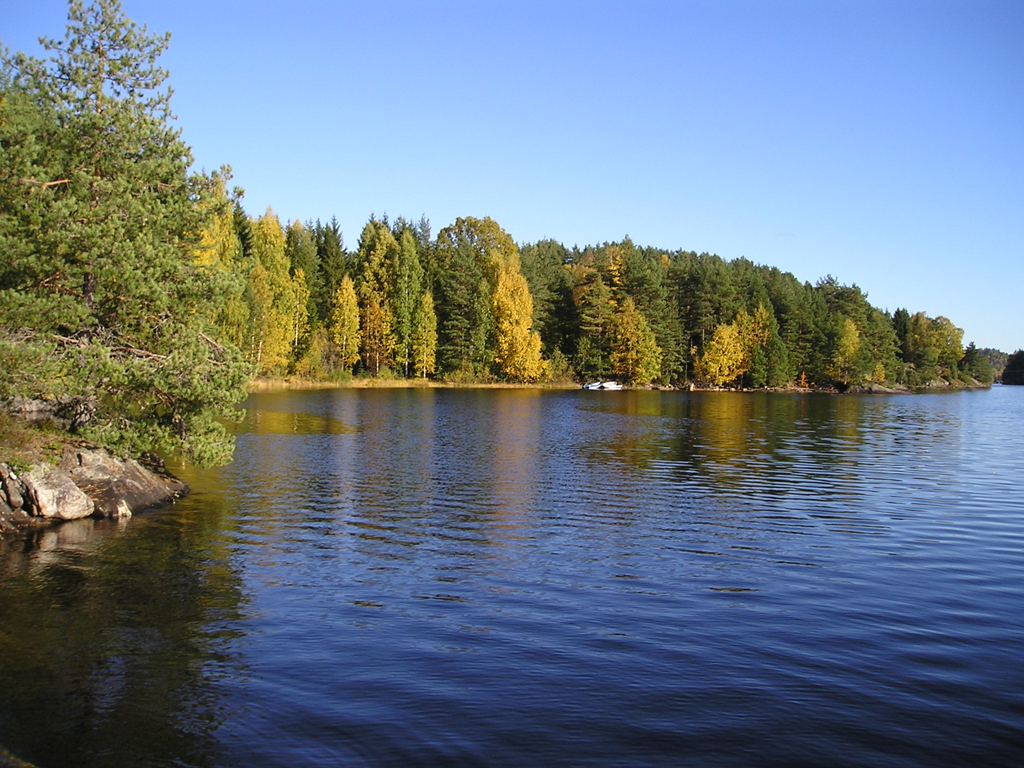
- View of the lake
- Interactive map of Toke
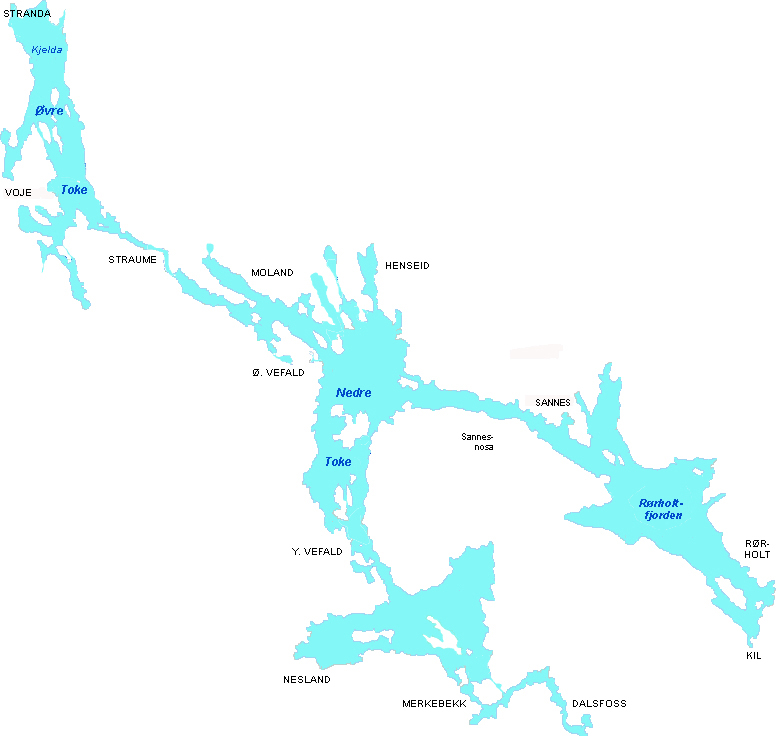
- Location: Bamble, Kragerø, Drangedal (Telemark)
- Coordinates: 58.98216°N 9.20797°E
- Primary inflows: Heldøla, Solbergelva and Tørneselva
- Primary outflows: Lundereidelva
- Catchment area: 1,156 km^{2} (446 sq mi)
- Basin countries: Norway
- Surface area: 30.3 km^{2} (11.7 sq mi)
- Average depth: 42.5 m (139 ft)
- Max. depth: 147.5 m (484 ft) (Rørholtfjorden)
- Water volume: 1.29 km^{3} (0.31 cu mi)
- Shore length^{1}: 185.5 km (115.3 mi)
- Surface elevation: 60.35–55.75 m (198.0–182.9 ft), regulated
- References: NVE
- ^{1} Shore length is not a well-defined measure.

Toke is a lake in Telemark county, Norway. The lake is located primarily in Drangedal Municipality, but it also extends slightly into Kragerø Municipality and Bamble Municipality. The lake consists of several areas: Upper Toke and Lower Toke, which is connected via Straumen, literally 'the stream'. At the north end of Upper Toke is the village of Prestestranda. In the south, the eastern arm of Lower Toke (Rørholtfjorden) reaches into Bamble Municipality and the southern part reaches into Kragerø Municipality, where its outlet is the river Lundereidelva where the Dalfoss hydroelectric plant is located. The lake, with its inflow, constitutes the majority of the Kragerø watershed.

With a surface of about 30 km^{2} (12 sq mi) and a drainage basin of 1,156 km^{2} (446 sq mi), Toke is a substantial body of water in Telemark. Its approximately 185 km (115 mi)-long shoreline, a large part of which consists of an old lakebed with clay and deposits of silt, is strongly exposed to erosion because of development for power production.

With its long shoreline and innumerable larger and smaller islands and narrow bays, Toke is a popular destination for boaters and sport fishers. Trout, Arctic char, whitefish, and perch are all found in the lake. The municipality's investment areas for the development of leisure housing are mainly located around Tokevassdraget and in the Gautefall area. The municipality's plans for these areas provide for increased use of the areas for outdoor recreation.

== History ==
After the last ice age, about 9,500 years ago, the sea along the coast of Telemark was about 100 metres (330 ft) higher than today and the old Drangedalsfjorden reached about 60 km (37 mi) into the mainland from Kragerø, through Drangedal, and up to Bø in Tørdal (this fjord was where the present lake is now located). The land rose quickly after the weight of the ice had gone. After about 1,000 years Toke became a lake, as it is known today. At the bottom of Rørholtfjorden, about 90 m (300 ft) under the surface of the sea, a 10–12 m (33–39 ft) layer of saltwater still exists from that time.

Since the arrival of humans in the area, Toke has served as a main artery between the sea and the inland. Remnants from the Stone Age are found spread along the banks and on the islands of the lake. Cairns from the Bronze Age and Iron Ages are a common sight along the water's edge.

== Boat traffic ==
In 1864, a canal was constructed in Straumen, 'the stream', between Upper and Lower Toke to make trade with larger vessels possible, and to make the transport of timber easier. Steamboat traffic started the same year, with DS Tokedølen which serviced the Prestestranda-Merkebekk stretch. In the fall of 1888, the more luxurious DS Turist joined the boat traffic. The owner of this boat, Halvor H. Strømme, had plans to build a canal in the area from Merkebekk down to the sea, but nothing came of it.

Trains and buses overtook most transportation then, and Tokedølen ran out of steady traffic around 1923. Turist continued operating until 1929, when transport was taken care of by tugboats and barges.

Car traffic to Grenland was dependent on ferry transport across Lower Toke from Vefall to Kjenndalen, over the Vefall sound. This area was served by the ferry captain Karl Straume, first with barges of increasing size, and later with self-built ferries. The last ferry, MF Vefaldsund II, went out of service when riksvei (RV) 356 was built. RV356, on the east side of Toke and across Straume bridge, opened for traffic on 15 December 1967. This was the last inland ferry in this kind of trade in Norway. Today the sightseeing boat MS Tokedølen II sails on Toke: from Prestestranda in the north to Rørholtfjorden in Bamble and Merkebekk in Kragerø to the south.

== Regulation ==
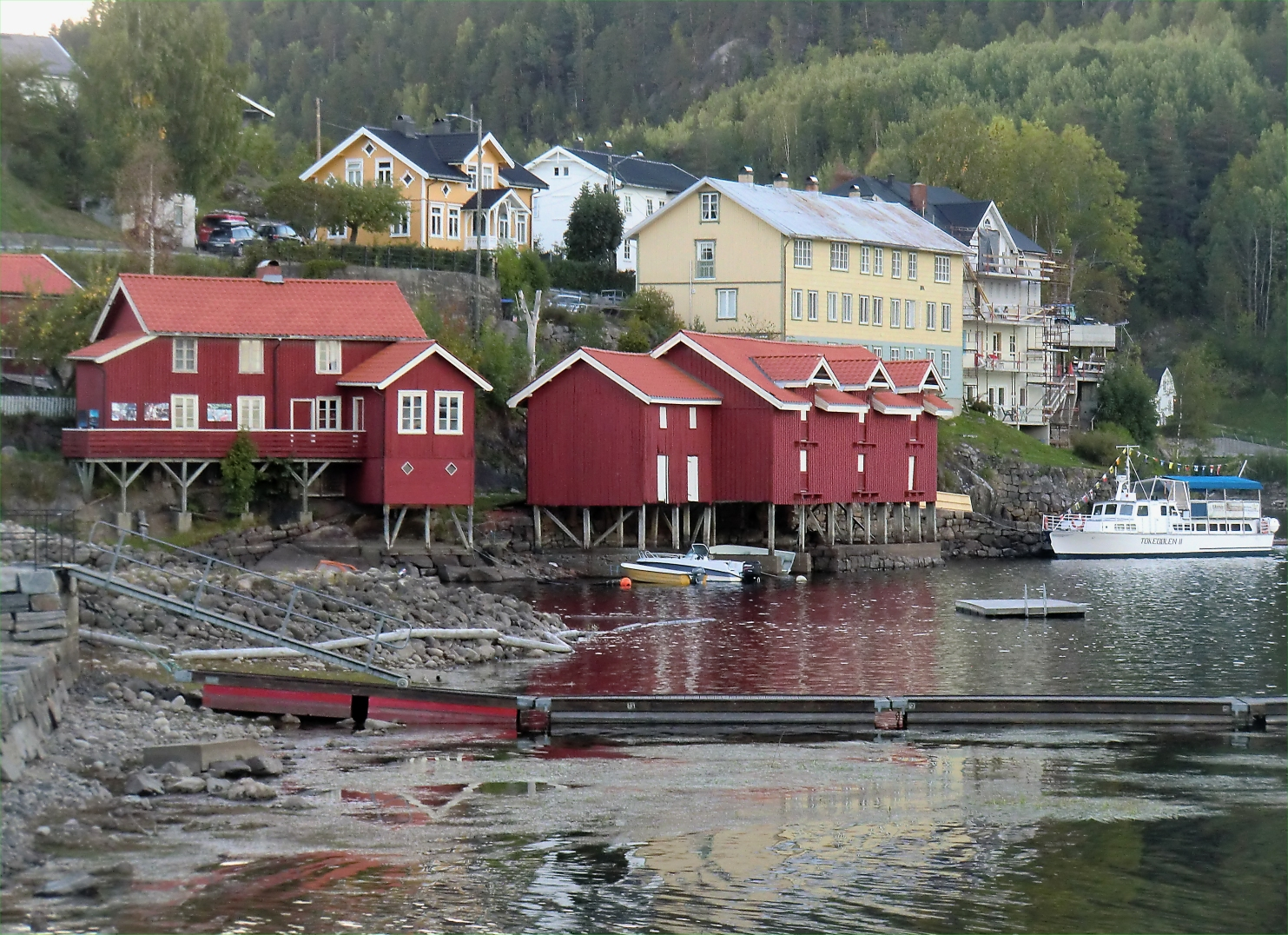
Very low water levels in Toke, here at Prestestranda in 2018

Around 1530, water-powered sawmills came to the area, and the use of saws and export of timber grew steadily. All of the rivers running into Toke were dammed for saw operation and timber transport, as well as Toke's outlet to the Lundereid river down towards Kragerø, where more sawing occurred, making use of the hydropower before the water went out into the sea.

Kragerøvassdragets fellesfløtningsforening (English: Kragerø Watershed Logging Association) was given the first rights to regulate and dam Toke (and Hoseidvann) in 1899. With the advent of electricity, the rights to dam Toke were given to Norsk Elektrokemisk Aktieselskap (Norwegian Electrochemical Corporation) in 1916. These rights were followed by more extensions and delays, before Toke was dammed around 1940 as it is seen today, from 55.75–60.35 m (182.9–198.0 ft) above sea level. On average, more than 32,000 L (7,000 imp gal; 8,500 US gal) of water run out of Toke each second. On its path towards the sea the water is used for power production in five hydroelectric plants throughout the municipality of Kragerø.

Since the beginning, regulation has been the subject of repeated complaints from the landowners along Toke, including Drangedal Municipality. They believe that the water rights are misinterpreted, and that the banks around Toke are illegally washed out unnecessarily every year.

== See also ==
- List of lakes in Norway
