= Drangedal Church =

Church in Telemark, Norway

- Drangedal kirke
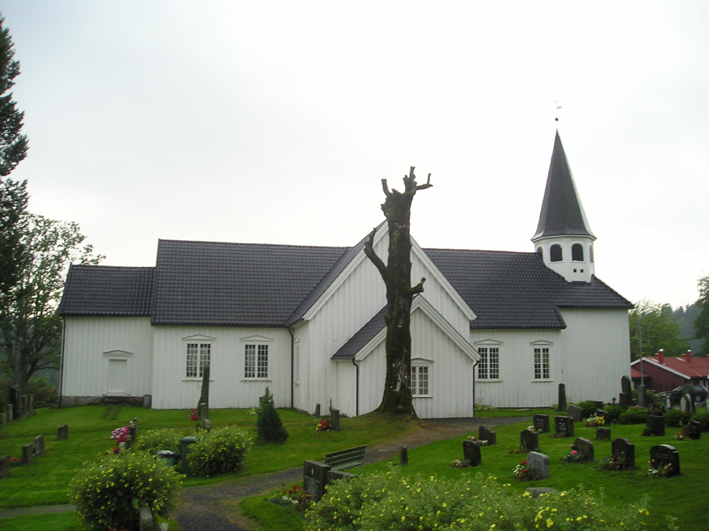
- View of the church
- Drangedal Church
- 59°05′53″N 9°03′53″E
- Location: Drangedal Municipality, Telemark
- Country: Norway
- Denomination: Church of Norway
- Previous denomination: Catholic Church
- Churchmanship: Evangelical Lutheran

History
- Former name: Herikseid kirke
- Status: Parish church

Architecture
- Functional status: Active
- Architectural type: Cruciform
- Completed: 1775 (251 years ago)

Specifications
- Capacity: 300
- Materials: Wood

Administration
- Diocese: Agder og Telemark
- Deanery: Bamble prosti
- Parish: Drangedal
- Norwegian Cultural Heritage Site
- Type: Church
- Status: Automatically protected
- ID: 84034

Drangedal Church (Norwegian: Drangedal kirke) is a parish church of the Church of Norway in Drangedal Municipality in Telemark county, Norway. It is located in the village of Prestestranda. It is the church for the Drangedal parish which is part of the Bamble prosti (deanery) in the Diocese of Agder og Telemark. The white, wooden church was built in a cruciform design in 1775 using plans drawn up by an unknown architect. The church seats about 300 people.

== History ==
The earliest existing historical records of the church date back to the year 1395, but the church was not built that year. The first church in Drangedal was a wooden stave church that was possibly built during the early 13th century. Historically, the church was also known as Herikseid Church. In the early 1700s, the old stave church was enlarged. A new nave was built out of log construction off the west end of the old church. Then, the nave of the old stave church was repurposed as the choir of the new church.

In the early 1770s, the church was expanded again by adding two transept wings to either side of the nave to create a cruciform design. Also, a small bell tower was built on the roof of the nave. The tower had a wind vane on the top of the steeple with the year 1773 on it. The year was likely when the tower was built, but the full expansion project wasn't completed until 1775.

In 1814, this church served as an election church (Norwegian: valgkirke). Together with more than 300 other parish churches across Norway, it was a polling station for elections to the 1814 Norwegian Constituent Assembly which wrote the Constitution of Norway. This was Norway's first national elections. Each church parish was a constituency that elected people called "electors" who later met together in each county to elect the representatives for the assembly that was to meet at Eidsvoll Manor later that year.

From 1839 to 1842, the church was renovated again. This project included building an eastern transept and chancel to replace the old stave church that had been saved in the 1700s when the church was enlarged. A new church porch with a bell tower above was also built on the west end (and the tower on the nave roof was removed at the same time. There was a major interior renovation in 1898–1899 which was led by Haldor Børve. Many things were changed, but one of the more noticeable was the replacement of the old low and flat ceiling with a vaulted ceiling that is still in the church. Also the second floor seating gallery in the southern transept was removed and new galleries were built in the northern and western transepts. The old pews with doors were also replaced by new ones without doors.

== See also ==
- List of churches in Agder og Telemark
