= Drangedal Municipality =

Municipality in Telemark, Norway

Drangedal Municipality Drangedal kommune
- Municipality
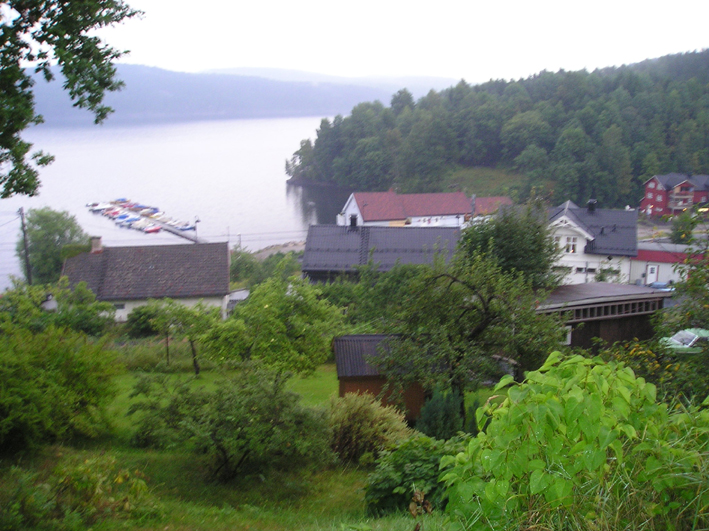
- View of Prestestranda

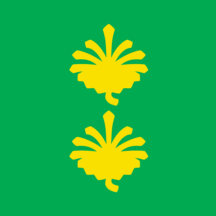
- Flag Coat of arms

- Telemark within Norway

- Drangedal within Telemark
- Coordinates: 59°7′24″N 8°58′55″E
- Country: Norway
- County: Telemark
- District: Grenland
- Established: 1 Jan 1838
  - Created as: Formannskapsdistrikt
- Administrative centre: Prestestranda

Government
  - Mayor (2023): Stina Sætre ((Sp))

Area
  - Total: 1,062.77 km^{2} (410.34 sq mi)
  - Land: 995.28 km^{2} (384.28 sq mi)
  - Water: 67.49 km^{2} (26.06 sq mi) 6.4%
  - Rank: #106 in Norway
- Highest elevation (Fagerliheii): 910 m (2,990 ft)

Population (2026)
  - Total: 4,056
  - Rank: #202 in Norway
  - Density: 4.1/km^{2} (11/sq mi)
  - Change (10 years): ▼ −1.9%
- Demonym: Drangedøl

Official language
  - Norwegian form: Neutral
- Time zone: UTC+01:00 (CET)
  - Summer (DST): UTC+02:00 (CEST)
- ISO 3166 code: NO-4016
- Website: Official website

Drangedal (Norwegian pronunciation: [ˈdrɑŋːədɑːl]; locally [ˈdrɑŋːəˌdɑːɽ]) is a municipality in Telemark county, Norway. It is located in the traditional district of Grenland. The administrative centre of the municipality is the village of Prestestranda. Other villages in Drangedal include Bø i Tørdal, Bostrak, Gautefall, Henseid, and Neslandsvatn.

The 1,062.77-square-kilometre (410.34 sq mi) municipality is the 106th largest by area out of the 357 municipalities in Norway. Drangedal Municipality is the 202nd most populous municipality in Norway with a population of 4,056. The municipality's population density is 4.1 inhabitants per square kilometre (11/sq mi) and its population has decreased by 1.9% over the previous 10-year period.

The administrative centre, Prestestranda, is situated by Lake Toke. The municipal government is located there along with primary and secondary schools, shopping facilities, and a bank. Drangedal railway station is also located in Prestestranda and is served by the Oslo to Kristiansand Sørlandsbanen railway line. It was formerly connected to the Kragerø railway line, but that was closed in 1989.

The district of Tørdal encompasses the northwestern part of the municipality. Alpine and cross-country skiing is possible in Tørdal. Telemark's largest ski resort is located in Gautefall. The newspaper Drangedalsposten is published in Drangedal.

== General information ==
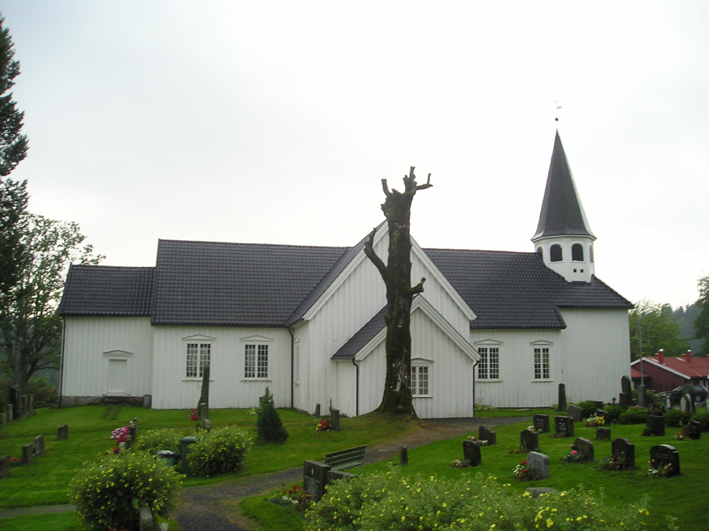
Drangedal Church

=== Administrative history ===
The formannskapsdistrikt law of 1837 created a system of local government in Norway by establishing each town (ladested or kjøpstad) and each Church of Norway prestegjeld as a civil municipality. On 1 January 1838, Drangedal prestegjeld was established as Drangedal Municipality. The borders of the municipality have not changed since that time (which is pretty rare among municipalities in Norway).

In 2020, there were many municipal and county mergers across Norway due to the work of the Solberg cabinet. Historically, this municipality was part of Telemark county. On 1 January 2020, the municipality became a part of the newly-formed Vestfold og Telemark county (after Telemark and Vestfold counties were merged). The merger was shortlived, and on 1 January 2024, the merger was undone and this municipality became part of Telemark county once again.

=== Name ===
The municipality is named after the old Drangedal prestegjeld. The prestegjeld was named after the Drangedal valley (Old Norse: Drangadalr). The first element is the plural genitive case of the word drangr which means "pointed or jutting cliff or stone" or "mountain peak". The last element is dalr which means "valley" or "dale".

=== Coat of arms ===
The coat of arms was granted on 21 April 1989. The official blazon is "Vert, two pine cones Or in pale" (Norwegian: I grønt to gull furukongler, 1-1). This means the arms have a green field (background) and the charge is a set of two pine cones lined up vertically. The charge has a tincture of Or which means it is commonly colored yellow, but if it is made out of metal, then gold is used. The green color in the field and the pine cone design symbolizes the vast forests in the municipality. The arms were designed by Daniel Rike. The municipal flag has the same design as the coat of arms.

=== Churches ===
The Church of Norway has three parishes (sokn) within Drangedal Municipality. It is part of the Bamble prosti (deanery) in the Diocese of Agder og Telemark.

Churches in Drangedal Municipality
Parish (sokn)	Church name	Location of the church	Year built
Drangedal	Drangedal Church	Prestestranda	1775
Kroken	Kroken Church	Kroken	1909
Tørdal	Tørdal Church	Bø	1809

== Geography ==
The highest point in the municipality is the 910-metre (2,990 ft) tall mountain Fagerliheii, located on the border with Kviteseid Municipality. The Tørdal valley was located in the northern part of the municipality. The large lake Toke is located in the municipality.

Nome Municipality is located to the north, Skien Municipality is located to the east, Bamble Municipality is located to the east southeast, Kragerø Municipality is located to the southeast, Gjerstad Municipality (in Agder county) is located to the south, Nissedal Municipality is located to the west, and Kviteseid Municipality is located to the northwest.

== Government ==
Drangedal Municipality is responsible for primary education (through 10th grade), outpatient health services, senior citizen services, welfare and other social services, zoning, economic development, and municipal roads and utilities. The municipality is governed by a municipal council of directly elected representatives. The mayor is indirectly elected by a vote of the municipal council. The municipality is under the jurisdiction of the Nedre Telemark District Court and the Agder Court of Appeal.

=== Municipal council ===
The municipal council (Kommunestyre) of Drangedal Municipality is made up of 21 representatives that are elected to four year terms. The tables below show the current and historical composition of the council by political party.

Drangedal kommunestyre 2023–2027
Party name (in Norwegian)	Number of representatives
Labour Party (Arbeiderpartiet)	7
Progress Party (Fremskrittspartiet)	3
Green Party (Miljøpartiet De Grønne)	1
Christian Democratic Party (Kristelig Folkeparti)	1
Centre Party (Senterpartiet)	5
Socialist Left Party (Sosialistisk Venstreparti)	1
Joint list of the Conservative Party (Høyre) and the Liberal Party (Venstre)	3
Total number of members:	21

Drangedal kommunestyre 2019–2023
Party name (in Norwegian)	Number of representatives
Labour Party (Arbeiderpartiet)	6
Progress Party (Fremskrittspartiet)	2
Conservative Party (Høyre)	1
Christian Democratic Party (Kristelig Folkeparti)	1
Centre Party (Senterpartiet)	10
Socialist Left Party (Sosialistisk Venstreparti)	1
Total number of members:	21

Drangedal kommunestyre 2015–2019
Party name (in Norwegian)	Number of representatives
Labour Party (Arbeiderpartiet)	6
Progress Party (Fremskrittspartiet)	1
Conservative Party (Høyre)	2
Christian Democratic Party (Kristelig Folkeparti)	2
Centre Party (Senterpartiet)	7
Socialist Left Party (Sosialistisk Venstreparti)	1
Liberal Party (Venstre)	2
Total number of members:	21

Drangedal kommunestyre 2011–2015
Party name (in Norwegian)	Number of representatives
Labour Party (Arbeiderpartiet)	10
Progress Party (Fremskrittspartiet)	2
Conservative Party (Høyre)	2
Christian Democratic Party (Kristelig Folkeparti)	2
Centre Party (Senterpartiet)	2
Socialist Left Party (Sosialistisk Venstreparti)	1
Liberal Party (Venstre)	2
Total number of members:	21

Drangedal kommunestyre 2007–2011
Party name (in Norwegian)	Number of representatives
Labour Party (Arbeiderpartiet)	8
Progress Party (Fremskrittspartiet)	2
Conservative Party (Høyre)	1
Christian Democratic Party (Kristelig Folkeparti)	2
Centre Party (Senterpartiet)	3
Socialist Left Party (Sosialistisk Venstreparti)	2
Liberal Party (Venstre)	3
Total number of members:	21

Drangedal kommunestyre 2003–2007
Party name (in Norwegian)	Number of representatives
Labour Party (Arbeiderpartiet)	8
Progress Party (Fremskrittspartiet)	3
Conservative Party (Høyre)	1
Christian Democratic Party (Kristelig Folkeparti)	2
Centre Party (Senterpartiet)	2
Socialist Left Party (Sosialistisk Venstreparti)	3
Liberal Party (Venstre)	2
Total number of members:	21

Drangedal kommunestyre 1999–2003
Party name (in Norwegian)	Number of representatives
Labour Party (Arbeiderpartiet)	11
Conservative Party (Høyre)	2
Christian Democratic Party (Kristelig Folkeparti)	4
Centre Party (Senterpartiet)	3
Socialist Left Party (Sosialistisk Venstreparti)	3
Liberal Party (Venstre)	6
Total number of members:	29

Drangedal kommunestyre 1995–1999
Party name (in Norwegian)	Number of representatives
Labour Party (Arbeiderpartiet)	12
Conservative Party (Høyre)	2
Christian Democratic Party (Kristelig Folkeparti)	4
Centre Party (Senterpartiet)	6
Socialist Left Party (Sosialistisk Venstreparti)	2
Liberal Party (Venstre)	3
Total number of members:	29

Drangedal kommunestyre 1991–1995
Party name (in Norwegian)	Number of representatives
Labour Party (Arbeiderpartiet)	10
Conservative Party (Høyre)	2
Christian Democratic Party (Kristelig Folkeparti)	4
Centre Party (Senterpartiet)	4
Socialist Left Party (Sosialistisk Venstreparti)	6
Liberal Party (Venstre)	3
Total number of members:	29

Drangedal kommunestyre 1987–1991
Party name (in Norwegian)	Number of representatives
Labour Party (Arbeiderpartiet)	15
Conservative Party (Høyre)	2
Christian Democratic Party (Kristelig Folkeparti)	4
Centre Party (Senterpartiet)	3
Socialist Left Party (Sosialistisk Venstreparti)	2
Liberal Party (Venstre)	3
Total number of members:	29

Drangedal kommunestyre 1983–1987
Party name (in Norwegian)	Number of representatives
Labour Party (Arbeiderpartiet)	16
Conservative Party (Høyre)	4
Christian Democratic Party (Kristelig Folkeparti)	4
Centre Party (Senterpartiet)	2
Socialist Left Party (Sosialistisk Venstreparti)	1
Liberal Party (Venstre)	2
Total number of members:	29

Drangedal kommunestyre 1979–1983
Party name (in Norwegian)	Number of representatives
Labour Party (Arbeiderpartiet)	14
Conservative Party (Høyre)	4
Christian Democratic Party (Kristelig Folkeparti)	5
Centre Party (Senterpartiet)	2
Socialist Left Party (Sosialistisk Venstreparti)	1
Joint list of the Liberal Party (Venstre) and New People's Party (Nye Folkepartiet)	3
Total number of members:	29

Drangedal kommunestyre 1975–1979
Party name (in Norwegian)	Number of representatives
Labour Party (Arbeiderpartiet)	13
Christian Democratic Party (Kristelig Folkeparti)	6
Centre Party (Senterpartiet)	4
Socialist Left Party (Sosialistisk Venstreparti)	1
Liberal Party (Venstre)	2
Joint list of the Conservative Party (Høyre) and New People's Party (Nye Folkepartiet)	3
Total number of members:	29

Drangedal kommunestyre 1971–1975
Party name (in Norwegian)	Number of representatives
Labour Party (Arbeiderpartiet)	14
Conservative Party (Høyre)	1
Christian Democratic Party (Kristelig Folkeparti)	4
Centre Party (Senterpartiet)	4
Socialist People's Party (Sosialistisk Folkeparti)	1
Liberal Party (Venstre)	5
Total number of members:	29

Drangedal kommunestyre 1967–1971
Party name (in Norwegian)	Number of representatives
Labour Party (Arbeiderpartiet)	15
Conservative Party (Høyre)	1
Christian Democratic Party (Kristelig Folkeparti)	3
Centre Party (Senterpartiet)	3
Socialist People's Party (Sosialistisk Folkeparti)	1
Liberal Party (Venstre)	6
Total number of members:	29

Drangedal kommunestyre 1963–1967
Party name (in Norwegian)	Number of representatives
Labour Party (Arbeiderpartiet)	16
Christian Democratic Party (Kristelig Folkeparti)	3
Centre Party (Senterpartiet)	3
Socialist People's Party (Sosialistisk Folkeparti)	1
Liberal Party (Venstre)	9
List of workers, fishermen, and small farmholders (Arbeidere, fiskere, småbrukere liste)	1
Total number of members:	33

Drangedal herredsstyre 1959–1963
Party name (in Norwegian)	Number of representatives
Labour Party (Arbeiderpartiet)	15
Christian Democratic Party (Kristelig Folkeparti)	3
Centre Party (Senterpartiet)	4
Liberal Party (Venstre)	8
List of workers, fishermen, and small farmholders (Arbeidere, fiskere, småbrukere liste)	3
Total number of members:	33

Drangedal herredsstyre 1955–1959
Party name (in Norwegian)	Number of representatives
Labour Party (Arbeiderpartiet)	18
Christian Democratic Party (Kristelig Folkeparti)	5
Farmers' Party (Bondepartiet)	4
Liberal Party (Venstre)	6
Total number of members:	33

Drangedal herredsstyre 1951–1955
Party name (in Norwegian)	Number of representatives
Labour Party (Arbeiderpartiet)	17
Christian Democratic Party (Kristelig Folkeparti)	4
Farmers' Party (Bondepartiet)	4
Liberal Party (Venstre)	7
Total number of members:	32

Drangedal herredsstyre 1947–1951
Party name (in Norwegian)	Number of representatives
Labour Party (Arbeiderpartiet)	18
Christian Democratic Party (Kristelig Folkeparti)	5
Farmers' Party (Bondepartiet)	1
Joint list of the Liberal Party (Venstre) and the Radical People's Party (Radikale Folkepartiet)	8
Total number of members:	32

Drangedal herredsstyre 1945–1947
Party name (in Norwegian)	Number of representatives
Labour Party (Arbeiderpartiet)	21
Christian Democratic Party (Kristelig Folkeparti)	6
Joint list of the Liberal Party (Venstre) and the Radical People's Party (Radikale Folkepartiet)	5
Total number of members:	32

Drangedal herredsstyre 1937–1940*
Party name (in Norwegian)	Number of representatives
Labour Party (Arbeiderpartiet)	17
Liberal Party (Venstre)	14
Local List(s) (Lokale lister)	1
Total number of members:	32
Note: Due to the German occupation of Norway during World War II, no elections were held for new municipal councils until after the war ended in 1945.

=== Mayors ===
The mayor (Norwegian: ordfører) of Drangedal Municipality is the political leader of the municipality and the chairperson of the municipal council. The following people have held this position:

- 1838–1839: Rev. Paul Resen Hofgaard
- 1839–1843: Ole Nielsen
- 1843–1845: Jon Jonsen Aabø
- 1849–1851: Olav Markussen Vefall
- 1851–1853: Halvor Persen Tørdal
- 1853–1857: Jon Jonsen Aabø
- 1857–1861: Halvor Persen Tørdal
- 1862–1863: Lars Markussen Naas
- 1863–1868: Per Ellingsen Vaaje
- 1868–1869: Olav Stiansen Sannes
- 1869–1877: Per Ellingsen Vaaje
- 1877–1879: Rev. Johan Fr. Oberlin Jespersen
- 1879–1881: Per Ellingsen Vaaje
- 1881–1882: Rev. Johan Fr. Oberlin Jespersen
- 1882–1883: Olav Torjussen
- 1883–1893: Nils J. Brødsjø
- 1893–1894: Knut Jonsen Bustrak
- 1894–1897: Gunnar Tomassen Naas
- 1897–1901: Dr. Martin Solberg
- 1901–1908: Nils J. Brødsjø
- 1908–1914: Elling Nilsmundsen Valnes
- 1914–1919: Olav Sannes
- 1919–1919: Per Jonsen Lauvstad
- 1920–1923: Hans Sjetne
- 1923–1925: Olav Sannes
- 1926–1928: Hans Sjetne
- 1929–1931: Per Tungebakke
- 1932–1940: Tor O. Lundtveit (Ap)
- 1941–1942: Olav K. Straume (NS)
- 1942–1943: Halvor N. Oseid (NS)
- 1943–1945: Anund K. Haugen (NS)
- 1945–1946: Tor O. Lundtveit (Ap)
- 1946–1947: Knut H. Strand (Ap)
- 1948–1959: Ivar H. Bjåland (Ap)
- 1959–1961: Olav Vellene (V)
- 1961–1963: Halvor Lauvstad (V)
- 1964–1971: Helge Føreland (Ap)
- 1971–1975: Knut Haugland (Ap)
- 1975–1979: Jon P. Holte (KrF)
- 1979–1980: Tore Straume (Ap)
- 1981–1981: Paul Myra (Ap)
- 1982–1987: Tore Straume (Ap)
- 1987–1991: Knut Haugland (Ap)
- 1991–1995: Svein Kolloen (Ap)
- 1995–1999: Ove A. Haugland (Sp)
- 1999–2003: Arnt Olav Brødsjø (V)
- 2003–2011: Nils Tore Føreland (Ap)
- 2011–2015: Karianne Sydtveit Reiten (Ap)
- 2015–2023: Tor Peder Lohne (Sp)
- 2023–present: Stina Sætre (Sp)

== Notable people ==
- Hallvard Graatop (early 15th century), a rebel leader opposing the Crown and the bailiffs who may have lived at the Vraalstad farm in Drangedal
- Andrew Gulickson (1856 in Drangedal – 1941), a Norwegian American politician, member of Wisconsin State Assembly
- Knud Wefald (1869 in Yttre Vefald – 1936), a Norwegian American politician in the United States House of Representatives
- Abraham Aakre (1874 in Drangedal – 1948), a teacher and politician who was Mayor of Halden
- Finn Støren (1893–1962), a civil servant for Nasjonal Samling, lived in Drangedal from 1933
- Knut T. Storbukås (born 1943 in Bostrak), a musician and truck driver, stage name Sputnik
- Nils Tore Føreland (born 1957), a politician who was Mayor of Drangedal from 2003-2011
- Vidar Sundstøl (born 1963), a crime fiction writer

== Gallery ==
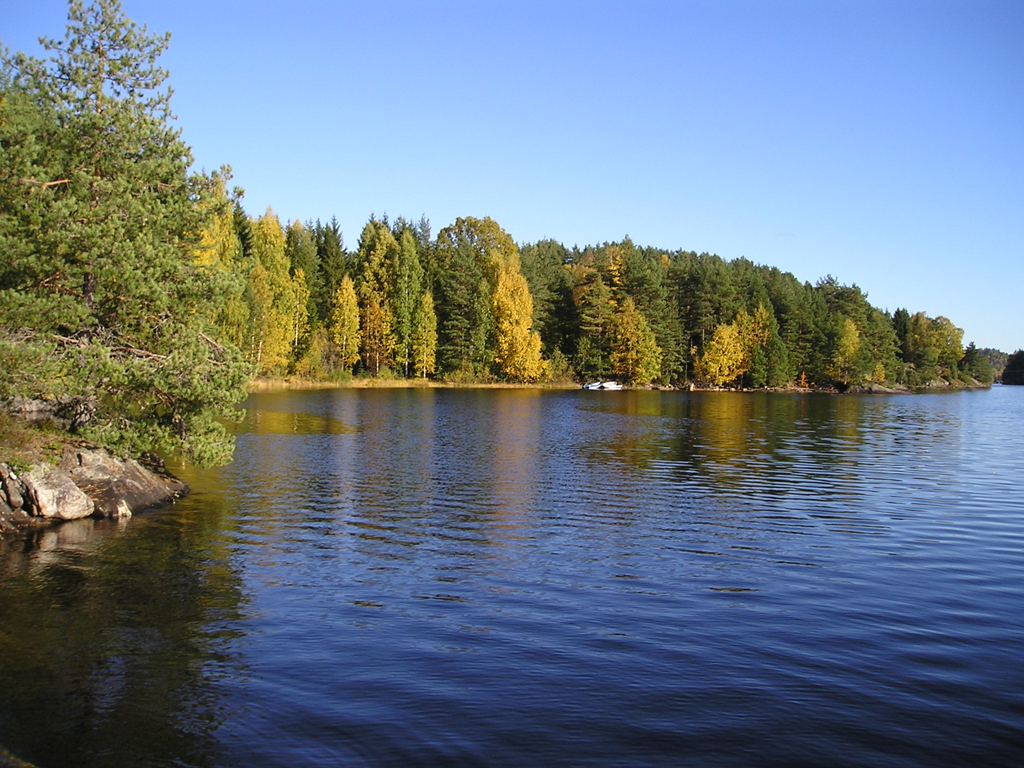
Toke, nedre. Kjendalsøya

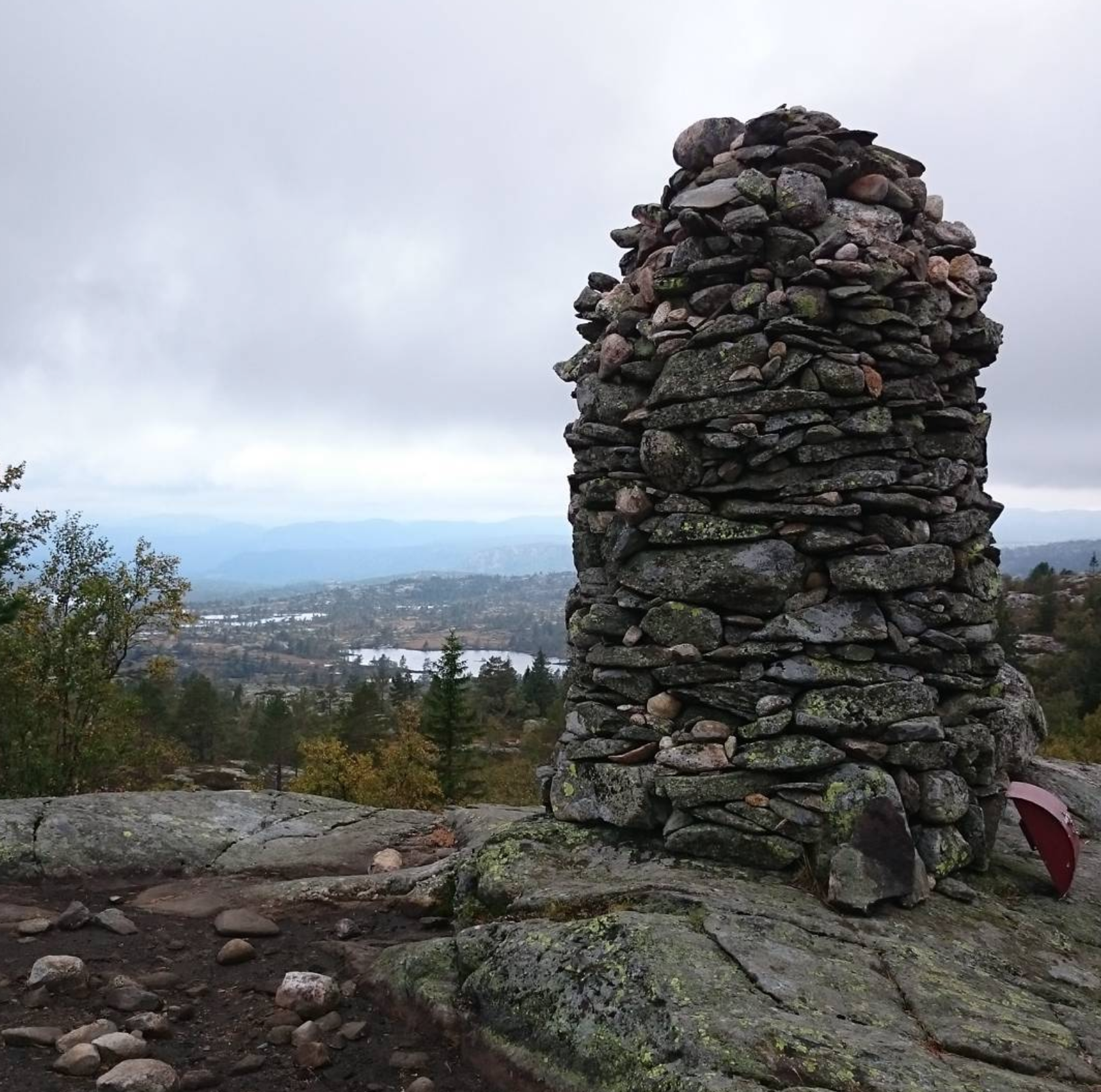
Blekavarden (Nonsåsheivarden) at Gautefall

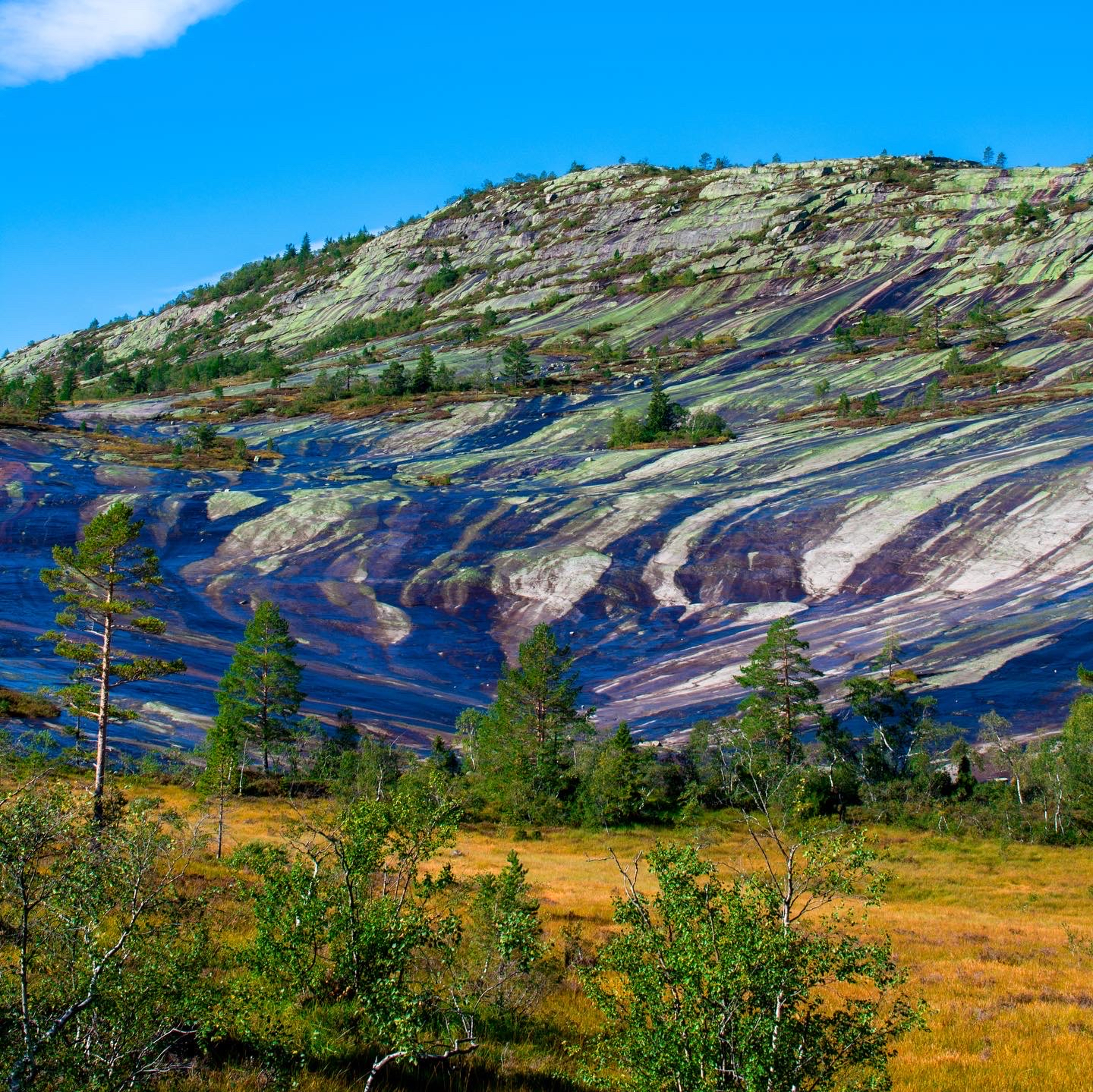
Himmelriket in Gautefall

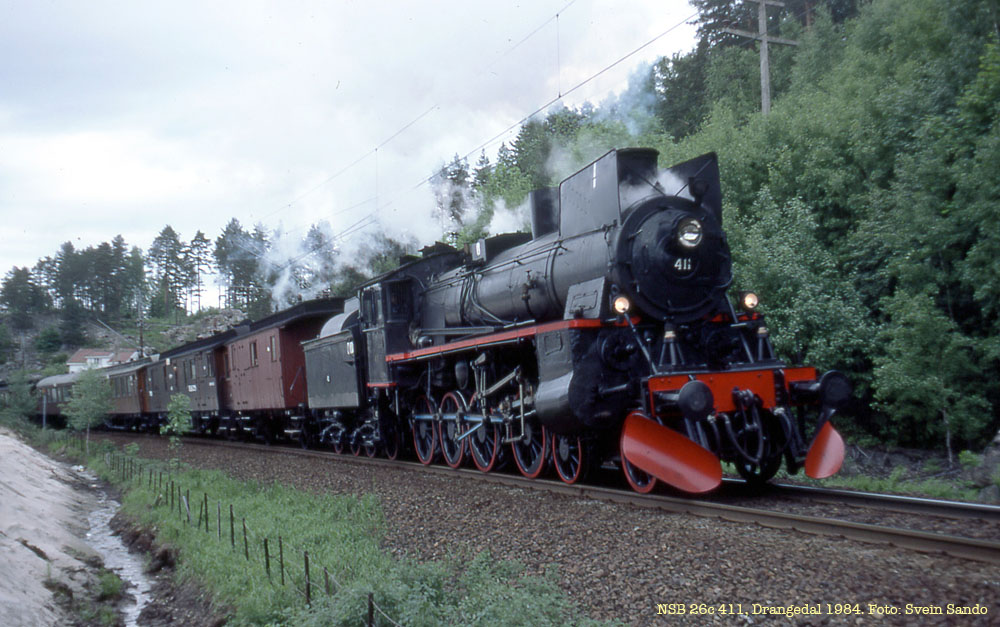
Vintage train near Drangedal in 1984
