= Sørlandet Line =

Railway line from Oslo to Stavanger, Norway

Coordinates: 58°17′37″N 7°58′47″E

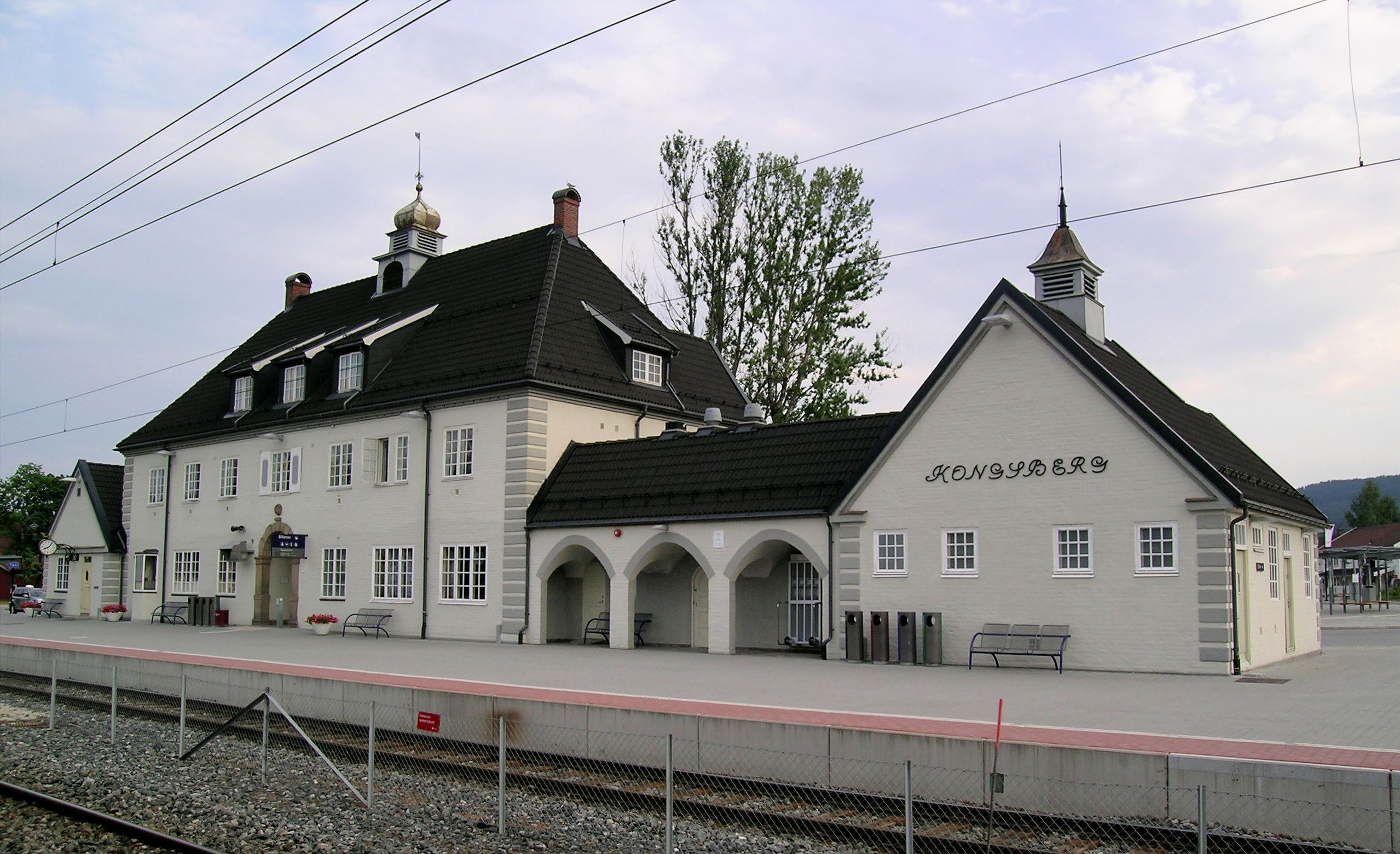
- Kongsberg Station

Overview
- Native name: Sørlandsbanen
- Owner: Bane NOR
- Termini: Drammen; Stavanger
- Stations: 27

Service
- Type: Railway
- Operator(s): Passenger: Go-Ahead Norge (2019-present); Vy (1871-2019); Freight: CargoNet
- Rolling stock: Class 73, El 18

History
- Opened: 1871 (to Kongsberg); 1944 (completed)

Technical
- Line length: 528
- Number of tracks: Single or Double
- Character: Long-haul passenger/freight
- Track gauge: 1,435 mm (4 ft 8 1/2 in)
- Electrification: 15 kV 16.7 Hz AC
- Operating speed: Max. 160 kilometres per hour (99 mph)

The Sørlandet Line (Norwegian: Sørlandsbanen) is a railway line between Drammen (though this is connected to Oslo by means of the Drammen Line) via Kristiansand to Stavanger. The line is 545 kilometers (339 mi) long between Oslo and Stavanger.

== History ==
The railway was constructed in several phases, the first section being opened in 1871 and the last not opened until 1944. While there was a continual construction work from Oslo westward as far as Moi, the Jæren Line from Egersund to Stavanger in Western Norway was opened in 1878. Up to 1913 the name used on plans and for the completed sections was the Vestlandet Line (The West Country Line).

The Sørlandet Line was completed by the German occupation force during World War II. It was opened for regular traffic on 1 May 1944. The line was an important communications link for transportation of troops, as well as war material. Long stretches of the Sørlandet Line railway are set away from the coast, instead of on the more densely populated coastline. One reason for this was to protect the line from invading forces, and also to prevent the line being bombarded by navy ships.

On 15 November 1950 the Hjuksebø train disaster killed 14 people in a collision between an express train and runaway freight cars. On 15 December 2019 operation of passenger services passed from Vy to Go-Ahead Norge. Since then, Go-Ahead operates its long-haul passenger service between Oslo and Stavanger as Sørtoget ("The South Train").

== Subsections ==
Among the stretches which make up the Sørland Line are:

- Oslo–Drammen is the Drammen Line, completed in 1872.
- Drammen–Kongsberg, opened in 1871.
- Kongsberg–Bø, opened in 1924.
- Lunde–Neslandsvatn (Kragerø), opened in 1927.
- Neslandsvatn–Nelaug (Arendal), opened in 1935.
- Nelaug–Kristiansand, opened in 1938.
- Kristiansand–Moi, opened in 1944.
- Moi (Flekkefjord)–Egersund, opened in 1904.
- Egersund–Stavanger is the Jæren Line, which was opened in 1878.

== Branch lines ==
The Sørlandet Line has one operational branch line, the Arendal Line, which runs between Nelaug and Arendal. Another branch line, the Flekkefjord Line, from Sira to Flekkefjord, was once part of the main line. It was turned into a branch line upon completion of the Sørland Line in 1944, and was finally closed in 1990. Other branch lines which are now closed are the Numedal Line between Kongsberg and Rødberg (in Nore og Uvdal Municipality), the Setesdal Line and the Kragerø Line between Neslandsvatn and Kragerø.

Kristiansand Station is designed as a terminal station. Therefore, passenger-trains from Stavanger towards Oslo reverse direction when leaving Kristiansand. Freight trains use a direct connection between the eastern and western part of the line outside of Kristiansand, and do not have to change direction at Kristiansand station.

== Electrification ==
- Oslo – Brakerøya: 1922
- Brakerøya – Drammen: 1930
- Drammen – Kongsberg: 1929
- Kongsberg – Nordagutu: 1936
- Nordagutu – Lunde: 1942
- Lunde – Neslandsvatn: 1943
- Neslandsvatn – Nelaug: 1948
- Nelaug – Kristiansand: 1949
- Kristiansand – Marnadal: 1946
- Marnadal – Sira: 1944
- Sira – Egersund: 1950
- Egersund – Stavanger: 1956

== Route ==
=== Hokksund – Prestestranda ===
Starting point of the line is Hokksund in the Drammenselva valley, where it branches off from the Randsfjordbane southwest into the Vestfosselva valley. The route to Kongsberg then runs alongside the north bank of the Eikeren lake and crosses the watershed to Numedalslågen drainage basin. The railway line forms a horseshoe curve in the main valley -precisely the Kongsberg area -, passing Saggrenda to get back westwards. The county border to Telemark and a watershed near Heddalsvatnet (in Notodden Municipality) are crossed. While the main road E134 leads directly to Notodden, the southbound route forms a horseshoe curve in Ådalen before reaching Heddalsvatnet at Hjuksebø station on its eastern edge.

To the east of the lake, the route leads southwards, before the Saua river is bridged westwards at Akkerhaugen (in Midt-Telemark Municipality) at its confluence with the Heddalsvatnet. The line continues to Gvarv in the Gvarvelva valley, which we leave after calling at Bø (Telemark) southwards, going via side-valleys to Lunde, sitting at the Straumen river. In Lunde there is a bridge over the Telemark Canal. The route leads further to Prestestranda on the Tokke inland lake, crossing through Nome Municipality and Drangedal Municipality.

== See also ==
- Narrow gauge railways in Norway
