= Grenland =

Former district in Telemark county, Norway

Coordinates: 59°0′N 9°40′E

Grenland is a traditional district in Telemark county, in the south-east of Norway. "Grenland" has referred to varying locations throughout history. In modern times, Grenland refers to the areas of the municipalities of Skien, Porsgrunn, Bamble, and Siljan. Sometimes Kragerø Municipality and Drangedal Municipality are also considered to be part of the area. The region encompasses 1,794 square kilometres (693 sq mi) and has 122,978 inhabitants (2004), which translates as 12% of the area and 64% of the population of Telemark.

Grenland is the core area of a slightly larger traditional district known as Nedre Telemark ("Lower Telemark") which includes all of Grenland plus Midt-Telemark Municipality and the Heddal area of Notodden Municipality.

Grenland is also used as the name of an urban agglomeration consisting of the cities of Skien and Porsgrunn.

Areas that are part of Grenland
Municipality	Population	Area (km^{2})	Density (pop. per km^{2})
Skien Municipality	55,513	779	77
Porsgrunn Municipality	36,624	164	228
Bamble Municipality	14,056	304	50
Siljan Municipality	2,349	214	12
Drangedal Municipality	4,093	1063	4
Kragerø Municipality	10,351	305	36
Total	122,986	2,615	47

== History ==
In the early Viking Age, before Harald Fairhair, Grenland was a petty kingdom. Originally Grenland was probably the name of the region surrounding the lake Norsjø in Nedre Telemark. Grenland was located within the old Grænafylket (or Grenafylket) county which contained all of Grenland plus the coastal region known as Vestmar.

Vestmar is assumed to signify the land to the west of the sea (mar), however sea in this case should be interpreted as fjord, i.e. Langesundsfjorden. Vestmar was described as a county already in the 8th century AD.

The name Grenland is derived from a people, the Grener, i.e. "the land of the Grener". It is mentioned as a Gothic nation by Jordanes in his work Getica from about 551 AD: "Sunt quamquam et horum positura Granii, Agadii, Eunixi, Thelae, Rugi, Harothi, Ranii." (Getica, III:24)

=== 20th century ===
During the period of the municipality mergers in Norway, the chief administrative officer (fylkesmann) in Telemark proposed that the municipalities Skien, Solum, Gjerpen, Porsgrunn, Eidanger and Brevik be merged to form a large urban municipality centered on Skien. The municipalities had been closely integrated since the establishment of the Hydro factory at Herøya, and conurbation between the settlements was also significant.

However, the idea was opposed by Solum as well as Porsgrunn, Eidanger and Brevik and soon fell out of grace. Eidanger proposed a merger with Brevik and Porsgrunn, and the enlarged Porsgrunn municipality was finally created on 1 January 1964. Brevik lost its city status in the process. In light of this merger, the central authorities saw only one possible solution; a similar merger between Solum, Gjerpen and Skien. Unlike the first proposal, this was met by protests from Gjerpen - to no avail, as the case went to the Norwegian Parliament. The result was a significantly enlarged Skien municipality. On 1 January 1968 an area from the old Gjerpen and Solum municipalities with 3,554 inhabitants was moved to Porsgrunn.

In addition, the urban municipalities of Langesund and Stathelle were incorporated into the rural Bamble Municipality. Like Brevik, both Langesund and Stathelle lost their city status. Siljan municipality remained unaffected by the mergers, contrary to the initial expectations.
