= Krag (surname) =

The surname Krag may refer to:

- Astrid Krag (b. 1982) Danish politician
- Claus Krag (b. 1943) Norwegian professor of history
- Dorothea Krag (1675–1754) Danish noblewoman
- Erik Krag (1902–1987) Norwegian writer
- Frederik Krag (1655–1628) Danish ambassador
- Gillian Pederson-Krag
- Hans Hagerup Krag (1829–1907), Norwegian engineer
- Hans Krag (writer) (1904–1984), Norwegian author on heraldry
- Hjalmar Krag, Norwegian military officer, businessman and sports official
- Jens Otto Krag, Danish politician
- Johannes Krag, Danish clergyman
- Lul Krag (1878–1956) Norwegian painter
- Nikolaj Krag Christensen, Danish professional ice hockey player
- Nils Krag (1863–1926) Norwegian industrialist and inventor
- Niels Krag, Danish academic and diplomat
- Ole Herman Johannes Krag, (1837–1916) Norwegian firearms designer
- Peter Rasmus Krag (1825–1891) Norwegian army engineer and politician
- Rasmus Krag (1680–1755), Danish admiral
- Rasmus Krag (1763–1838), Danish military officer and engineer
- Sophia Magdalena Krag Juel Vind (1734–1810) Danish noblewoman and landowner
- Thomas Krag (1868–1913) Norwegian writer
- Vilhelm Krag (1871–1933) Norwegian poet

== See also ==
- Christian Emil Krag-Juel-Vind-Frijs, Danish nobleman and politician
- Jens Krag-Juel-Vind, Danish nobleman, Supreme Court justice and landowner
- Kragh, alternate Nordic spelling
