= Schnitler =

Schnitler is a surname. Notable people with the surname include:

- Carl Wille Schnitler (1879–1926), Norwegian art historian
- Diderik Schnitler (born 1946), Norwegian businessman
- Didrik Thomas Johannes Schnitler (1833-1888), Norwegian military officer and historian
- Gudmund Schnitler (1868–1925), Norwegian military officer and historian
- Gunvor Margaret Schnitler (born 1930), Norwegian politician
- Peter Schnitler (1690–1751), Danish/Norwegian jurist and military officer
