= Thomas Krag =

Norwegian novelist, playwright and writer of short stories

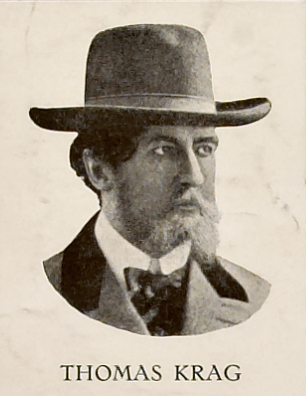
- Krag as featured on a 1918 poster
- Born: Thomas Peter Krag; 28 July 1868; Kragerø, Norway
- Died: 13 March 1913 (aged 44)
- Occupation: Writer
- Children: Erik Krag
- Parent: Peter Rasmus Krag
- Relatives: Nils Krag (brother); Vilhelm Krag (brother)

Thomas Peter Krag (28 July 1868 – 13 March 1913) was a Norwegian novelist, playwright and writer of short stories. He was born in Kragerø, grew up in Kristiansand, and settled in Copenhagen. Some of his books were bestsellers in Denmark when they were published, but today Krag is more or less sunk into oblivion.

== Personal life ==
Krag was born in Kragerø, as the son of parliament member Peter Rasmus Krag and Fredrikke Petrine Fyhn. The family moved to Kristiansand when he was two years old. Among his elder brothers were Hans Peter Fyhn Krag and businessman Nils Krag, and a younger brother was poet Vilhelm Krag. He was a grandson of Hans Peter Schnitler Krag. Among his uncles were Director General of public roads Hans Hagerup Krag and Colonel Ole Krag, and he was a cousin of painter Lul Krag. He was married to Ida Bengta Emilie Nielsen from 1901 to 1912, and was the father of literary historian Erik Krag.

== Career ==
Krag finished his secondary education in 1890. He made his literary debut in 1891, when he published his first book, the Indian story Fældejægeren eller Skovløberens Forræderi under the pseudonym "Edvard Cherson", and also the novel Jon Græff. In 1892 he published Fra den gamle By og andre Skildringer, and in 1893 came the story collection Ensomme Mennesker. Krag settled in Copenhagen, where he was part of the Norwegian colony that frequented the café Bernina, known for his eccentric behaviour and being a night owl. He was often sitting at Bernina until closing time, making notes of literary ideas on pieces of paper, and then continued writing at his home until dayspring. His novel Mulm was published in Copenhagen in 1893, and in 1894 he published the play Kong Aagon. The novel Kobberslangen was published in 1895. Willy Dahl holds the 1896 novel Ada Wilde as his best work. In 1897 he published the novel Ulf Ran and a collection of stories and fairytales titled Vesterfra. In 1898 he published the novel Beates Hus and the short story collection Tusmørke. In his literary history from 1924 Kristian Elster emphasizes Krag's 1904 novel Gunvor Kjeld. Præstens datter, where the religious struggles and fate of the priest "Kjeld" form the background for the later life of "Gunvor", the priest's daughter. Later books are Ildliljen and Stenbænken from 1905, Maagereden from 1906, Det Allerhelligste and Offerlam from 1907, and Tubal den Fredløse from 1908. In 1909 his play Kong Aagon was staged at Nationaltheatret in Kristiania, directed by his brother. In 1911 he published Fortællinger fra Kakkelovnskrogen, and in 1912 Frank Hjelm. Historien om en hjemløs.

He died in Kristiania in 1913. A memorial edition of his works, Mindeudgave (nine volumes) was issued between 1915 and 1917. He has been portrayed by illustrator Olaf Krohn and painters Christian Krohg, Oda Krohg and Henrik Lund.
