= Uchermann =

Uchermann is a Norwegian surname. Notable people with the surname include:

- Karl Uchermann (1855–1940), Norwegian painter and illustrator
- Vilhelm Uchermann (1852–1929), Norwegian physician
