= Karl Uchermann =

Norwegian painter and illustrator (1855–1940)

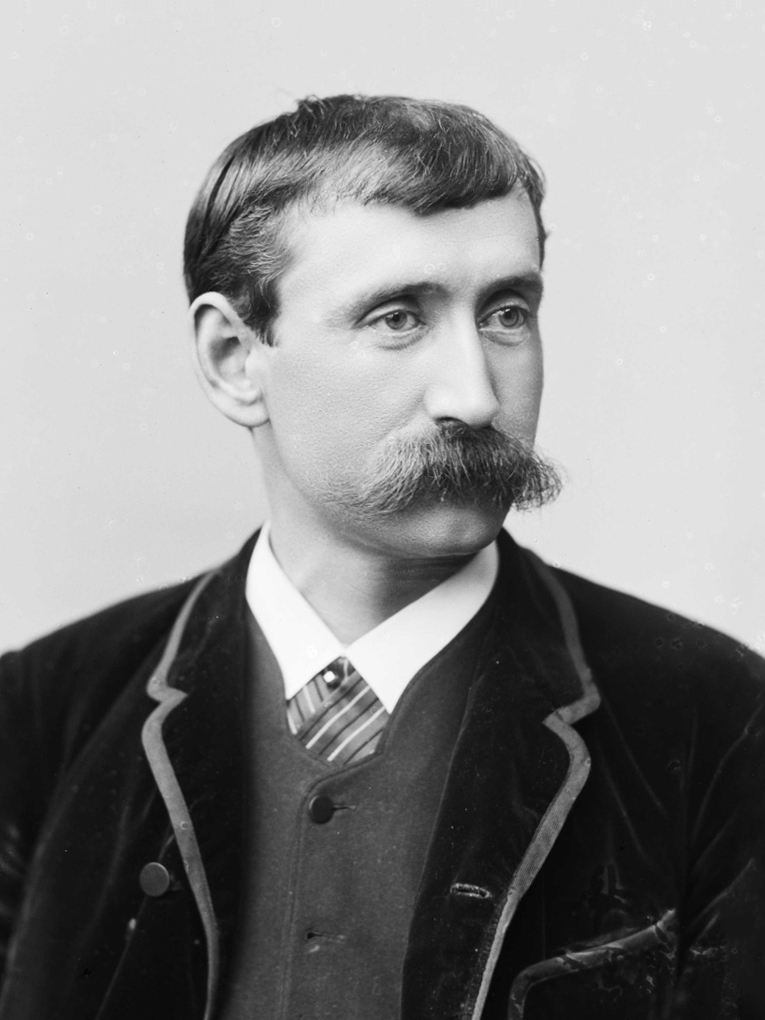
- Born: January 31, 1855; Borge, Lofoten, Norway
- Died: Oslo, Norway
- Education: Norwegian National Academy of Craft and Art Industry, Academy of Fine Arts, Munich
- Relatives: Frederik Stang (uncle), Emil Stang (cousin), Vilhelm Uchermann (cousin), Didrik Thomas Johannes Schnitler (father-in-law), Gudmund Schnitler (brother-in-law)
- Awards: King's Medal of Merit; 1935

Karl Uchermann (31 January 1855 – 15 October 1940) was a Norwegian painter and illustrator. He is best known for his portraits of animals, in particular dogs. He also painted altarpieces, and is credited for designing the world's first franking machine in 1901.

== Personal life ==
Uchermann was born in Borge Municipality in Lofoten, to parish priest Arnt Uchermann and Anna Stang, and married Bolette Hermana Schnitler in 1892. He was a nephew of prime minister of Norway Frederik Stang, a cousin of prime minister Emil Stang and physician Vilhelm Uchermann, a son-in-law of war historian Didrik Thomas Johannes Schnitler, and brother-in-law of war historian Gudmund Schnitler. He died in Oslo in 1940.

== Career ==
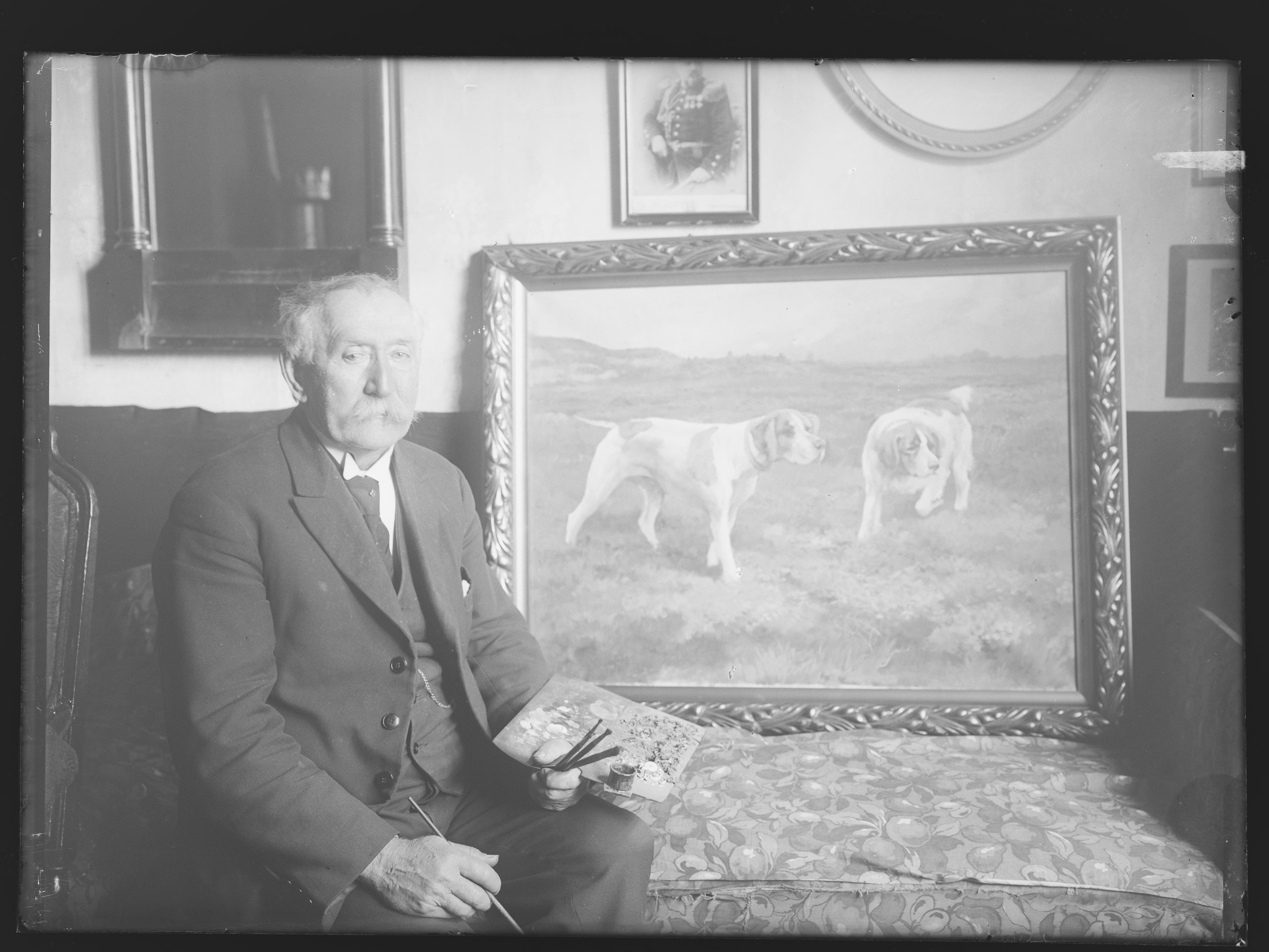
A photo of Uchermann taken sometime between 1899 and 1930

Uchermann studied at the Norwegian National Academy of Craft and Art Industry from 1872 to 1875, with Anders Askevold in Bergen from 1875 to 1876, at the Academy of Fine Arts in Munich from 1876 to 1878, and with Émile van Marcke in Paris from 1878 to 1881.

Uchermann is known for his paintings of animals, in particular dogs. Among his paintings are Flamsk hundeforspann from 1880, Fienden kommer from 1895, and I solveggen from 1899, all located at the National Gallery of Norway. Hvile paa Jagten from 1880 is located at the Musée des Beaux-Arts de Bordeaux. Julenek med fugler from 1882 is located at the Royal Palace, Oslo. He also painted altarpieces, and illustrated children's books and magazines.

He designed the world's first practical franking machine in 1901, which was further developed and manufactured in cooperation with Nils Krag.

He was awarded the King's Medal of Merit in gold in 1935.

== Selected books with illustrations by Uchermann ==
- Vers og Billeder (1885, jointly with F. Gjertsen)
- Norsk Lyrik efter 1814 (1891)
- Nordahl Rolfsen: Læsebog for folkeskolen (1892–1895)
- K. Gløersen: Fra jagten og naturen (1892)
- Carl Willoch Ludvig Horn: Lærebog i geografi for middelskolen (1893)
- O. D. Adeler: Den norske Robinson (1894)
- Theodor Caspari: Norsk Høifjeld (1898)
- Thorleif Schjelderup-Ebbe: Dyreliv. Digte for barn (1915)

== Gallery ==
Selected works by Karl Uchermann
Flamsk hundeforspann (1880)

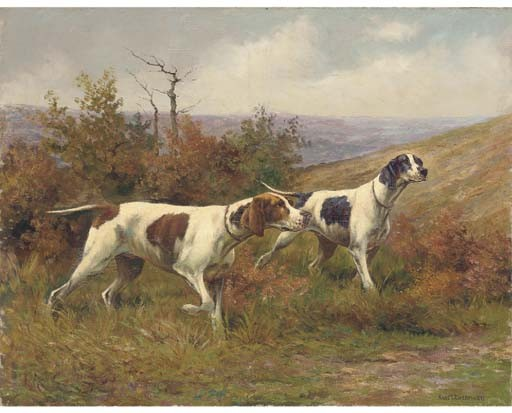
Hounds on the Scent

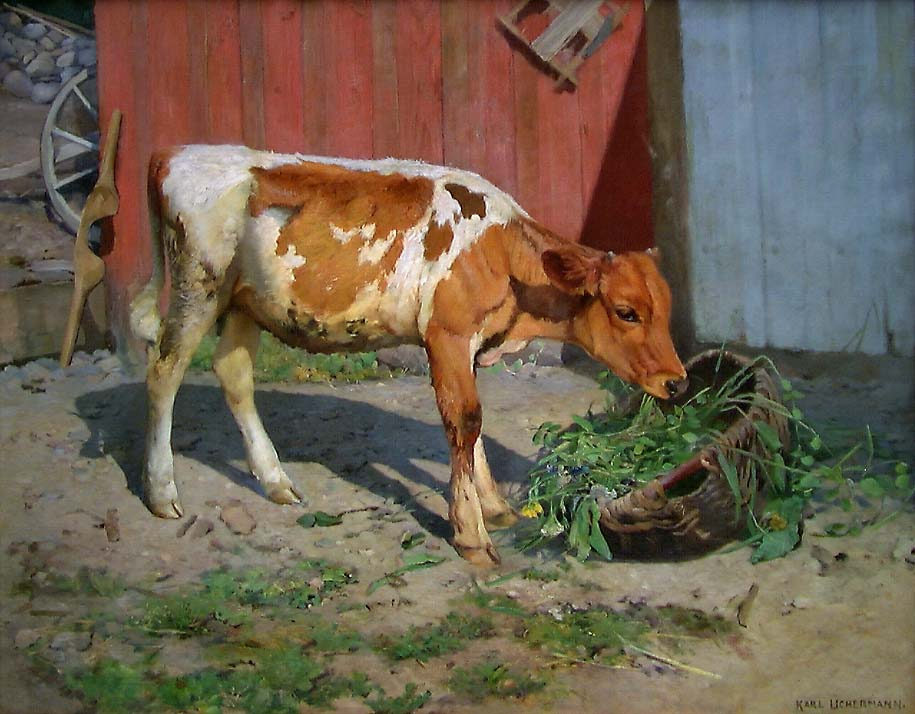
I solveggen (1899)
