= Tåtøy =

Island in Telemark, Norway

- Interactive map of the island

Geography
- Location: Telemark, Norway
- Coordinates: 58.85764°N 9.40829°E
- Archipelago: Kragerø
- Area: 1 km^{2} (0.39 sq mi)
- Length: 2.6 km (1.62 mi)
- Width: 625 m (2051 ft)
- Coastline: 6 km (3.7 mi)
- Highest elevation: 96 m (315 ft)
- Highest point: Høgda

Administration
- Norway
- County: Telemark
- Municipality: Kragerø Municipality

Tåtøy is an island in Kragerø Municipality in Telemark county, Norway. The 1-square-kilometre (250-acre) island is located in the Kilsfjord, just to the south of the mainland town of Kragerø. The small island of Kragerø lies about 1 kilometre (0.62 mi) to the northeast and the large island of Skåtøy lies about 2.5 kilometres (1.6 mi) to the east. The island is hilly and partly wooden. The highest point is the 96-metre (315 ft) tall Høgda.

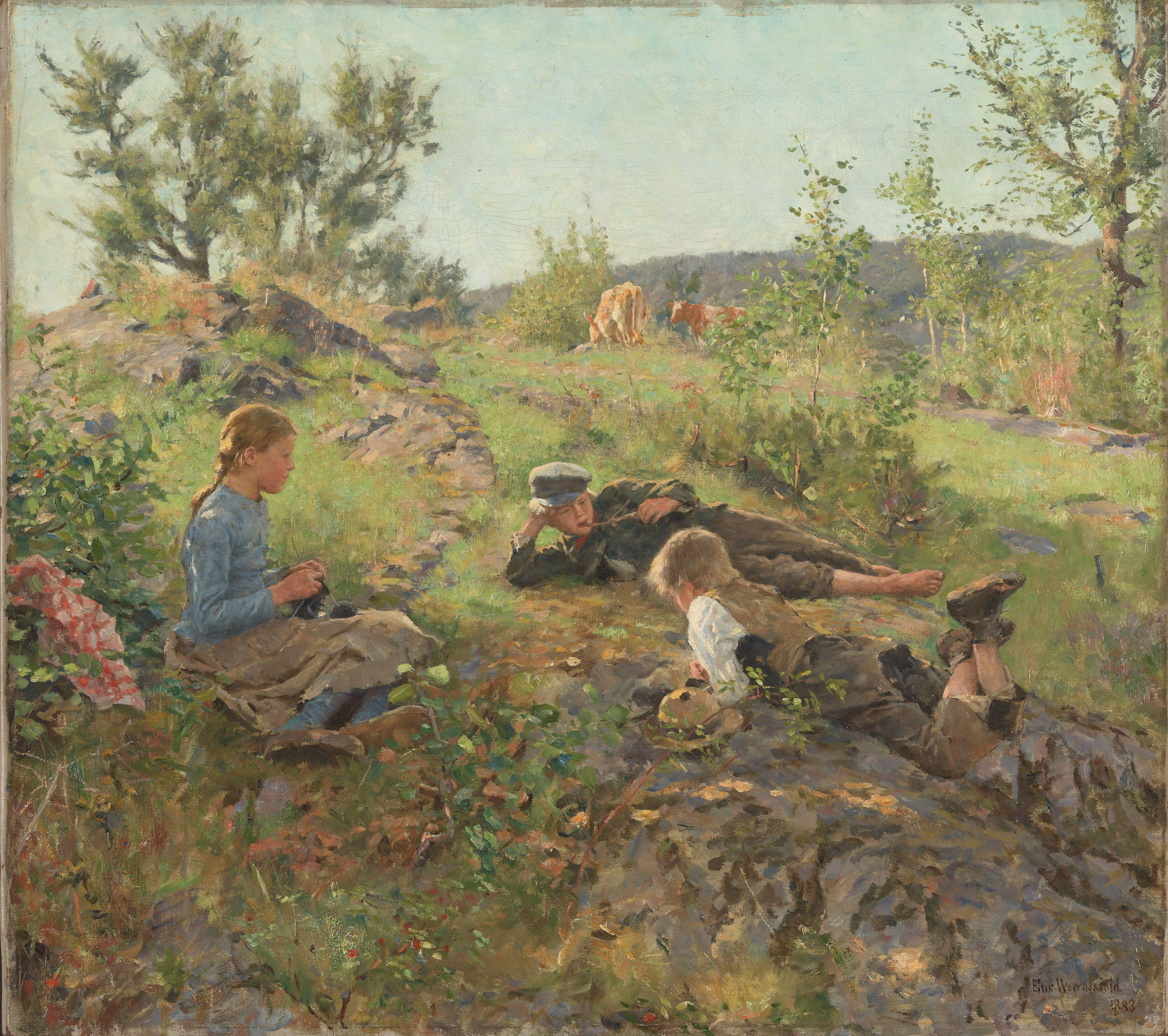
Painting of a scene from Tåtøy Credit: Erik Werenskiold

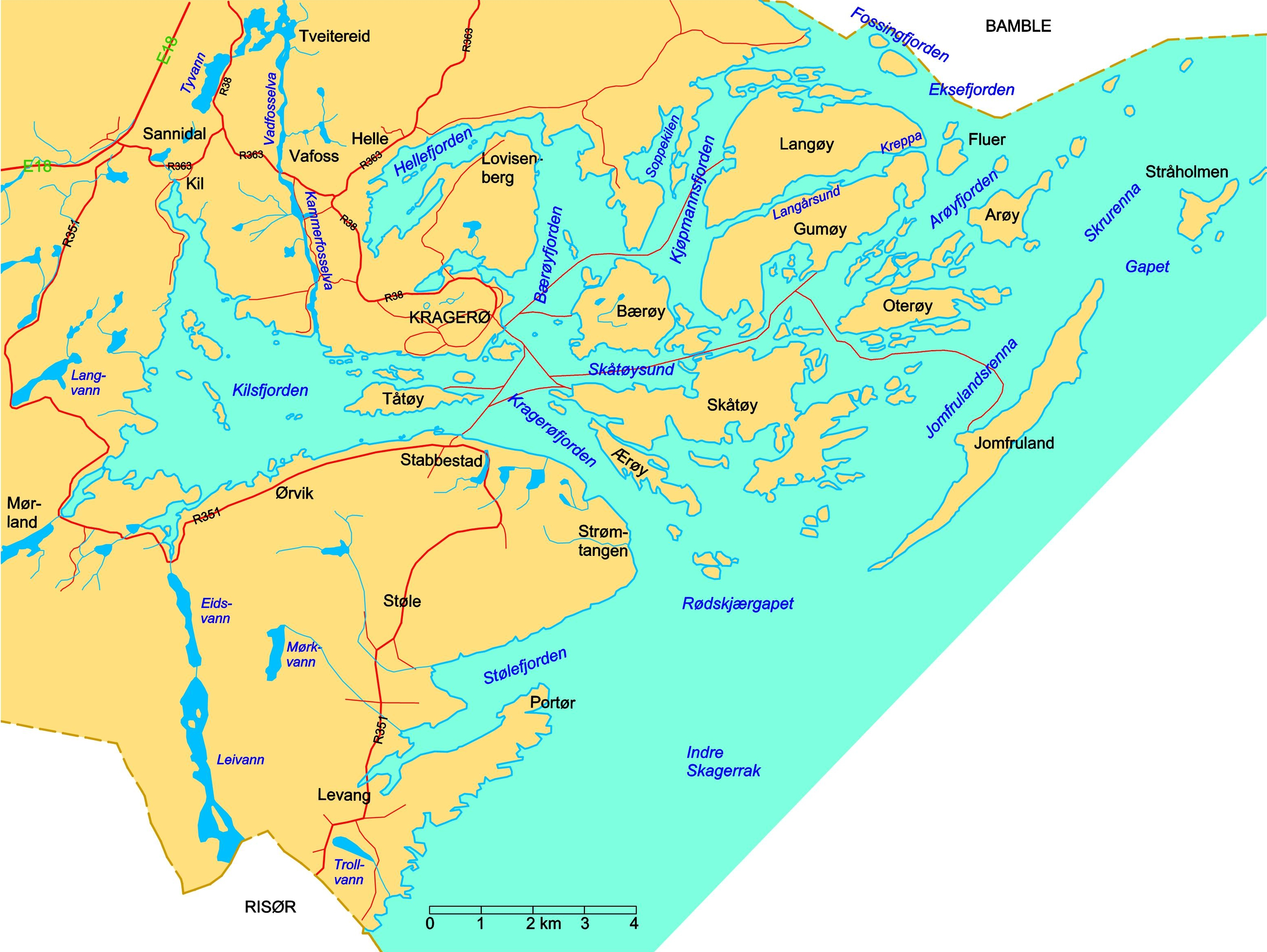
Map of the Kragerø islands

There was a school on the island until 2012 when it was closed. Kragerø Fjordbåtselskap runs a scheduled ferry service between Tåtøy and Stabbestad (on the mainland to the south), to the island of Skåtøy, and to the mainland town of Kragerø to the north.

== History ==
In the 16th-18th centuries, the Adeler family owned the island and then in the 19th century, Henrich Georg Tønder (1782-1834) purchased the island. Since 1864, the island has been divided into two farms, Tåtøy østre and Tåtøy vestre. At Manodden, a shipyard and a sawmill were built in the 19th century. The steam sawmill at Manodden was built in 1870. From here, boats with timber went to France, England, and Belgium.

In 1967 it was written in the newspaper that Tåtøy had Norway's oldest apple tree. The tree stood in the garden of farmer Alf Tåtøy. The tree is said to be from Henrich Tønder's time and that it was planted around 1825. There was no doubt that this tree was of the old grave stone variety, the tree still bore fruit. The journalist who wrote about this also had the pleasure of tasting an apple from a tree.

== See also ==
- List of islands of Norway
