= Vadfoss =

Village in Kragerø Municipality, Norway

Vadfoss Vafoss (unofficial)
- Village
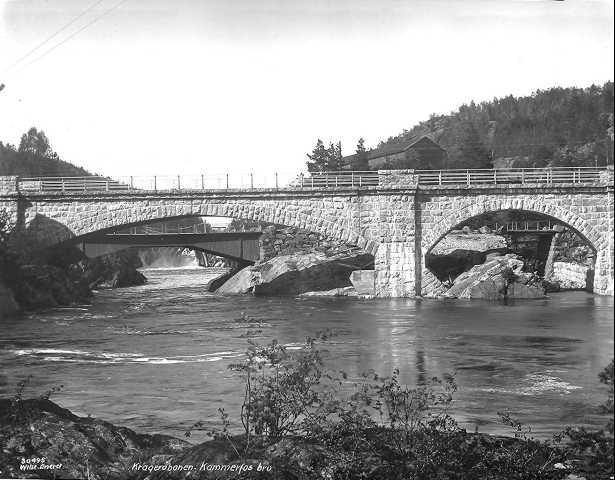
- View of the Kragerø Line passing over the Kammerfoss River at Vadfoss; Credit: Anders Beer Wilse/Norsk Folkemuseum
- Interactive map of Vadfoss
- Coordinates: 58.89187°N 9.34496°E
- Country: Norway
- Region: Eastern Norway
- County: Telemark
- District: Vestmar
- Municipality: Kragerø Municipality

Area
  - Total: 1.23 km^{2} (0.47 sq mi)
- Elevation: 25 m (82 ft)

Population (2025)
  - Total: 1,501
  - Density: 1,220/km^{2} (3,200/sq mi)
- Data for "Vadfoss/Helle"
- Time zone: UTC+01:00 (CET)
  - Summer (DST): UTC+02:00 (CEST)
- Post Code: 3790 Helle

Vadfoss is a village in Kragerø Municipality in Telemark county, Norway. The village is located along the river Kammerfosselva, about midway betweenthe villages of Helle to the east and Kil to the west. It is also close to the town of Kragerø, which is located roughly 5 kilometres (3.1 mi) to the southeast.

The villages of Vadfoss and Helle have grown together in conurbation, so Statistics Norway groups them together as one large urban village called Vadfoss/Helle. The 1.23-square-kilometre (300-acre) village area of Vadfoss/Helle has a population (2025) of 1,501 and a population density of 1,220 inhabitants per square kilometre (3,200/sq mi).

== Location ==
The river beside Vadfoss has no clear name due to the fact that it changes names several times along its length, but it is often referred to as the Kragerø watershed estuary or sometimes the Kragerø River (see the Gallery section for a graphical representation of its many names). In general terms, it is the river stemming from the lake Toke and leading out to the Kilsfjorden.

The main road serving Vadfoss is Norwegian county road 38, which extends north across the river Kammerfosselva to connect onto the European route E18 highway to the northwest and the road also heads southwest towards the town of Kragerø. County Road 38 runs concurrently with County Road 363 through Vadfoss. County Road 363 splits off from County Road 38, just northwest of Vadfoss and then heads west towards the village of Kil and it also splits off from County Road 38 on the south side of Vadfoss and heads east into Helle. In 2008, the 680 m (2,230 ft) long Vadfoss Tunnel was built just north of the Vadfoss Bridge on the main road, eliminating the need to take the longer and more residential Sannidalsveien.

Vadfoss historically had a train station along the now defunct Kragerø Line that primarily transported lumber and passengers. In 1989, the whole line south of Sannidal Station in Kil was torn up in order to make way for the new main road. Elements of the rail line still remain however, including the bridge across the river and the original station building from 1927, which is now used as a visitor center and bus depot.

== Industry ==
Though many people live in Vadfoss, the nearby river and the dam in the north of the village have made it a popular area for industry. Vafoss Dam was built in the late 1800s to power the Vafos AS pulp mill, the second such dam built on the river. In 1954, the Vafoss Power Plant was put into operation on the dam by Skagerak Kraft, with the provision that one of its turbines would be used to power the pulp mill. The hydroelectric plant uses two Francis turbines to convert a 13 m (43 ft) water drop into 15 gigawatt-hours (54,000 gigajoules) of power annually. As promised, one turbine directly powers the pulp mill, and Vafos AS is still in operation, producing about 80,000 tonnes (79,000 long tons; 88,000 short tons) of pulp yearly from locally sourced spruce logs.

Vafoss Power Plant is just one of seven hydroelectric plants in the Kragerø watershed, and one of five on the Kragerø River. Other nearby plants are the Langfoss Power Plant, which lies less than half a mile up the river, and Kammerfoss Power Plant to the south of Vadfoss. The five plants on the Kragerø River combined with the two others on Suvdøla in Drangedal Municipality produce an average of 123 GWh (440,000 GJ) of electricity per year.

== Gallery ==
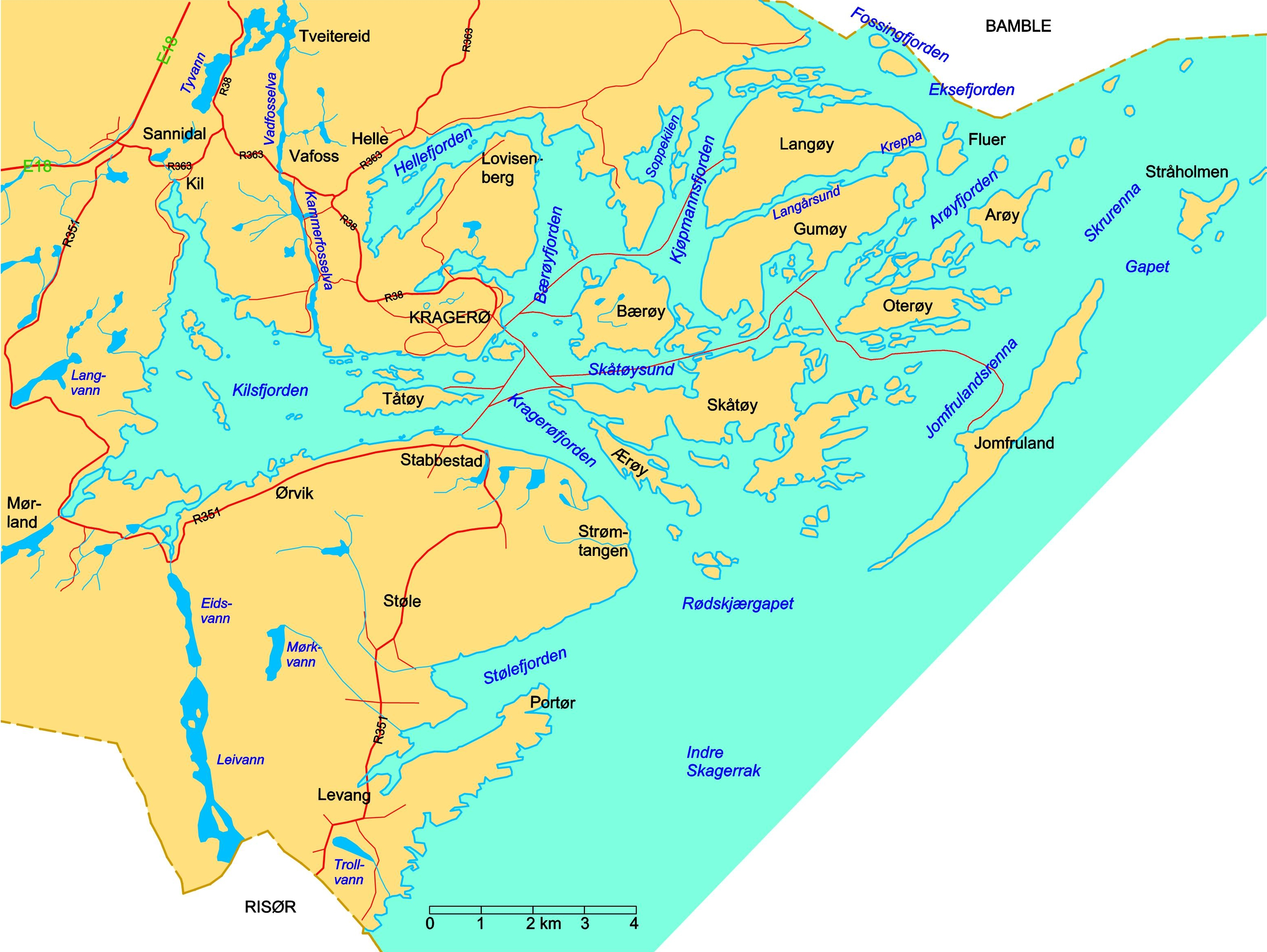
A closeup of the Kragerø archipelago. Vadfoss is on the upper right of this map using the alternate spelling of "Vafoss."

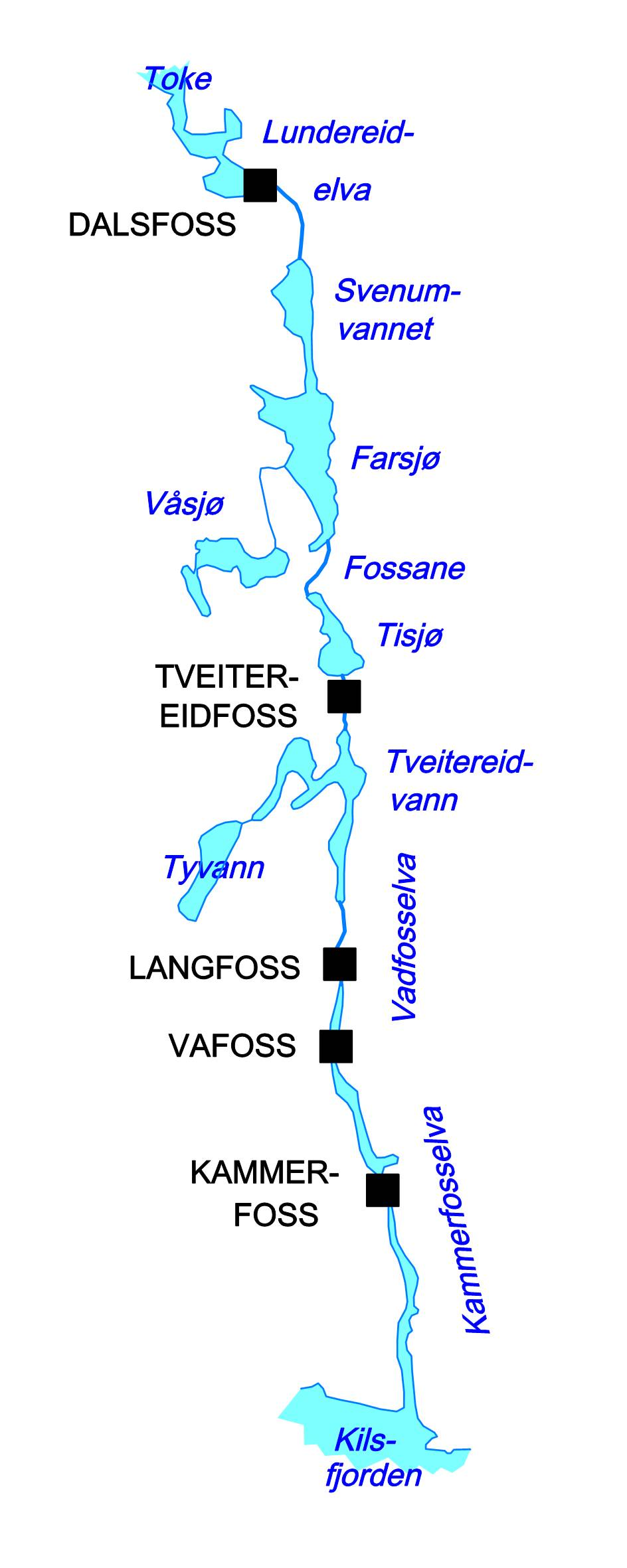
A map of the Kragerø watershed estuary, showing the names of the numerous bodies of water. The black squares represent power plants on the river.

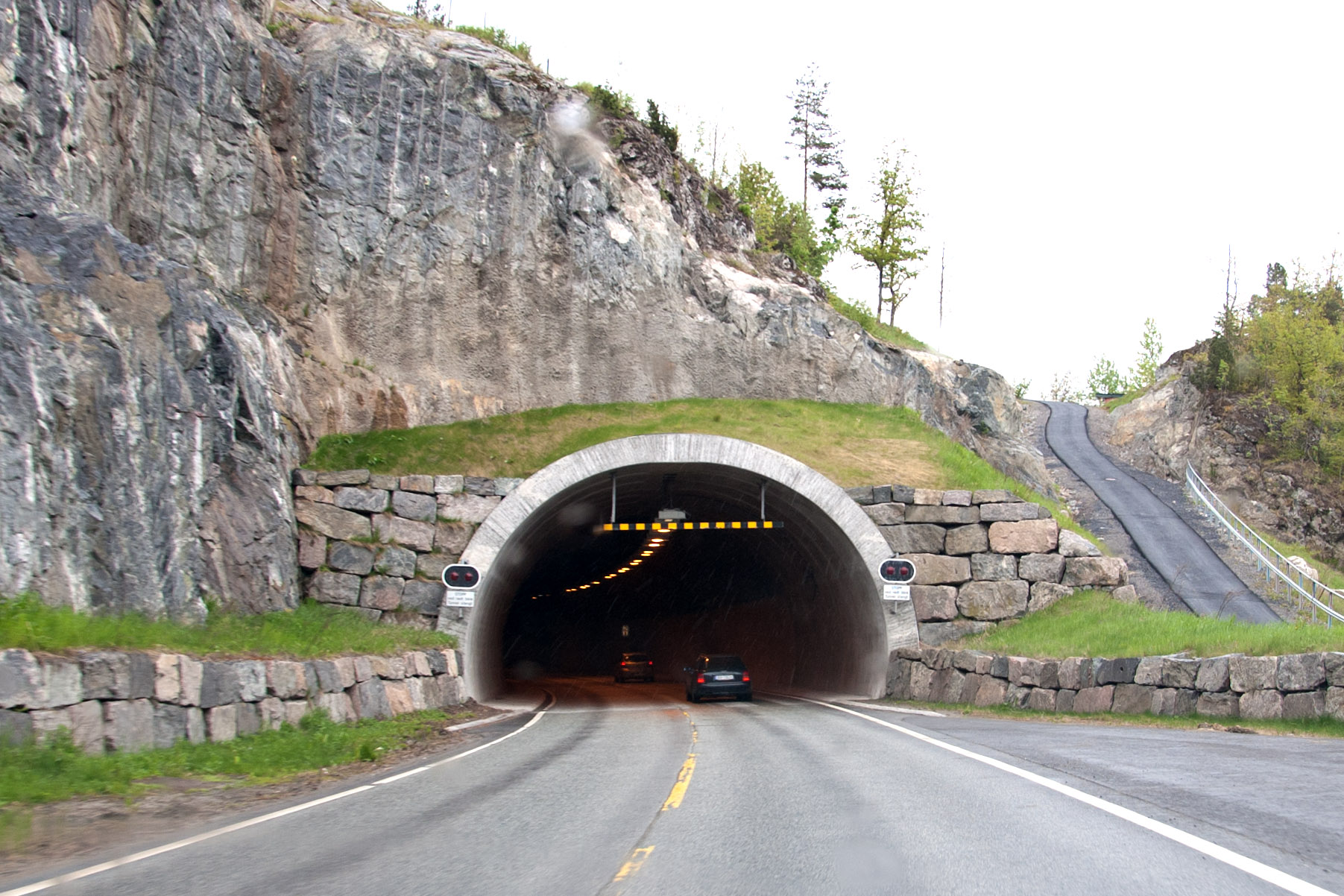
A view of the Vadfoss Tunnel from the north.
Photo: Peter Fiskerstrand
