= Carl Wille Schnitler =

Norwegian art historian

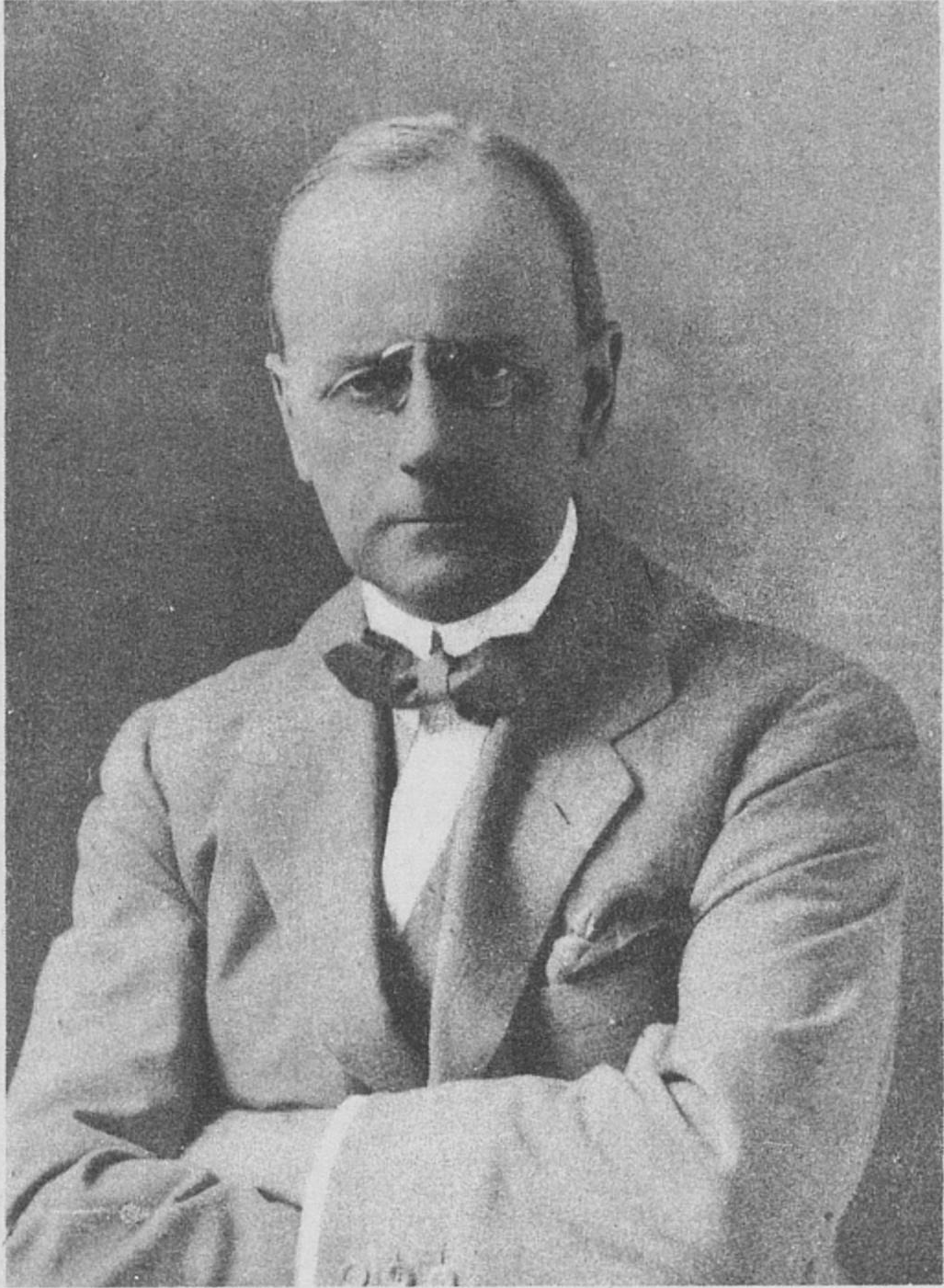
- Born: 24 June 1879; Kragerø, Norway
- Died: 28 October 1926 (aged 47); Oslo, Norway
- Education: University of Oslo
- Occupation: art historian

Carl Wille Schnitler (24 June 1879 – 28 October 1926) was a Norwegian art historian. He became noted for his national orientated writings on art history, which spanned from the antiquity to his contemporary society. He became best known for his work Slegten fra 1814, which became a primer in Norwegian historiography.

== Biography ==
He was born in Brandval Municipality in Hedmark county, Norway. He was the son of vicar Hans Peter Schnitler (1836–1894) and Marine Sophie Petrea Wille (1848–1919). He was a descendant of jurist Peter Schnitler (1690–1751) and a first cousin once removed of historian Didrik Schnitler (1833–1888). Upon finishing his examen artium in 1896, he enrolled at the Royal Frederic University where he took a philological degree in 1904. Initially not interested in art history, he came under the influence of professor Lorentz Dietrichson, (1834-1917) who taught the subject.

In the years 1906–11, he worked as an art critic for the newspaper Aftenposten and taught history of art at schools in Christiania. Upon Dietrichson's death in 1918, he entered the position as lecturer at the Royal Frederic University. Three years later, he was appointed professor. Prior to his appointment as professor of the Royal Frederic University, he made study trips in Europe and Egypt. Whilst in Italy, he studied Baroque visual art and architecture. In July 1926 he married Elisabeth Konow Bruenech (1898–1994) and died three months later.

== Work ==
In his first published work, Vore oldeforældres land (1910), he maintained that Norwegian artists of the 18th and 19th century had reacquired a feeling of nature that was lost in the Renessance. His best-known work Slegten fra 1814. Studier over norsk embedsmandskultur i klassicismens tidsalder 1814–1840. Kulturformene (1911) constituted an attempt to depict the culture of early 19th-century politicians and civil servants. Schnitler had, according to the literary scholar Ottar Grepstad, timed the release of that work, so that it could be read before the centennial anniversary of the 1814 constitution. In his 1914 published book Fredriksværn. Et norsk militæranlæg fra rokokotiden (1914) he maintained that the architecture of the naval base Fredriksvern was governed by Baroque ideals. He eventually released the work Norske haver i gammel og ny tid (1916) in two volumes, chapters of which were translated into Swedish. That work, which describes many centuried gardens, outlines the main traits of Norwegian and European gardening, and has become a standard reference work within the study of Norwegian horticulture.

His Italy studies resulted in the books Italiensk renæssance og barok i havekunst og bykunst (1917) and Reise i Grækenland. Glimt av Italien (1922). In 1920, he published the book Norges kunstneriske opdagelse. Maleren Erik Pauelsens norske landskaper 1788 in which he argued that the landscapes of Erik Pauelsen revealed an artist with a developed "feeling of art". In the same year he published Malerkunsten i Norge i det attende aarhundre, which was a systemic treatment of 18th-century paintings in Norway. In addition to his many published works, Schnitler penned numerous articles in art journals and newspapers. He also wrote a few entries on Norwegian artists in the encyclopaedias Allgemeines Lexikon der bildenden Künstler and Norsk biografisk leksikon. A selection of his articles was published posthumously in the work Kunsten og den gode form (1927).
