= Nils Krag =

Norwegian businessman, inventor and industrialist

Nils Aall Krag (30 November 1863 – 12 February 1926) was a Norwegian businessman, inventor and industrialist. He was the founder of the firm, Krag Maskinfabrikk A/S, now a division of Pitney Bowes.

Nils Krag was born at Risør in Nedenes county, Norway. He was a son of politician Peter Rasmus Krag. His father was a military engineer and member of the Norwegian Parliament. He was a brother of author Thomas Krag and poet Vilhelm Krag. He grew up in Kristiansand and attended Kristiansand Cathedral School (1881).

In 1891, he was co-owner of Krag & Steen which was registered under the name of Nils A. Krag in 1896. The company was engaged in wholesale trade. Between 1903-04 the company started the production of mechanical products. Artist Karl Uchermann designed the world's first practical franking machine during 1901 in Kristiania. In 1903, Uchermann and Krag received a patent on a postal franking machine.

Together with Gustav Adolph Hansen, Krag developed the Krag-Hansen stamping machine (Krag-Hansen-maskinen) for which they received patents dating from 1904. Krag also received additional patents on the further development of the machine. In 1934, Den Norske Frankeringsmaskin was established for the purpose of marketing franking machines under an exclusive agreement with Krag Maskinfabrikk A/S. In 2000, the company was sold to Pitney Bowes Inc.
