= Rasmus Krag =

Rasmus Krag may refer to:

- Rasmus Krag (1680–1755), Danish naval officer
- Rasmus Krag (1763–1838), Danish military officer
