= Krag (disambiguation) =

Krag may refer to:

- Krag (surname)
- Firearms associated with Ole Herman Johannes Krag:
  - Krag–Jørgensen rifle
  - Krag–Petersson rifle
  - .30-40 Krag
  - Krag–Jørgensen pistol
- Krag (Ninjago), a character in Ninjago
- Krag Mountains, Canada
- Krag, British Columbia, a ghost town in Canada

== See also ==
- Krąg (disambiguation)
