= Hjalmar Krag =

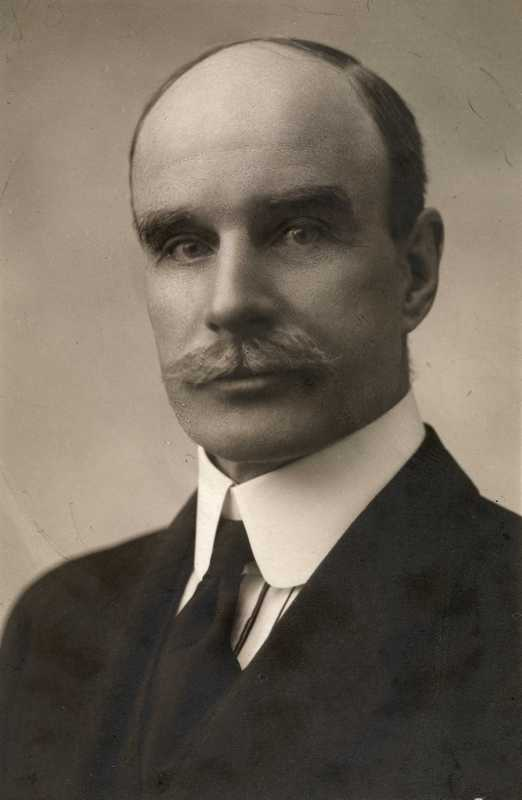
- Born: 2 July 1867; Vestre Aker, Sweden-Norway
- Died: 25 April 1954 (aged 86)
- Occupations: Military officer Businessperson; Sports official
- Parent: Hans Hagerup Krag
- Awards: Order of St. Olav; Order of the Dannebrog; Order of Vasa; Order of the Sword; Legion d'Honneur; Royal Victorian Order; Order of Saint Anna

Hjalmar Krag (2 July 1867 – 25 April 1954) was a Norwegian military officer, businessman and sports official.

Krag was born in Vestre Aker to director of the Norwegian Directorate of Public Roads, Hans Hagerup Krag, and Anna Marie Pedersen. He married Claudine Emilie Heiberg in 1896.

He graduated as military officer in 1889, and from the Norwegian Military College in 1893. He served as adjutant to Haakon VII of Norway from 1905 to 1908. From 1909 to 1912 he lectured at the Norwegian Military Academy. He chaired Norges Landsforbund for Idræt from 1919 to 1925. He was decorated Knight, First Class of the Order of St. Olav in 1935.
