= Helle, Telemark =

Village in Kragerø Municipality, Norway

Helle Vadfoss/Helle
- Village
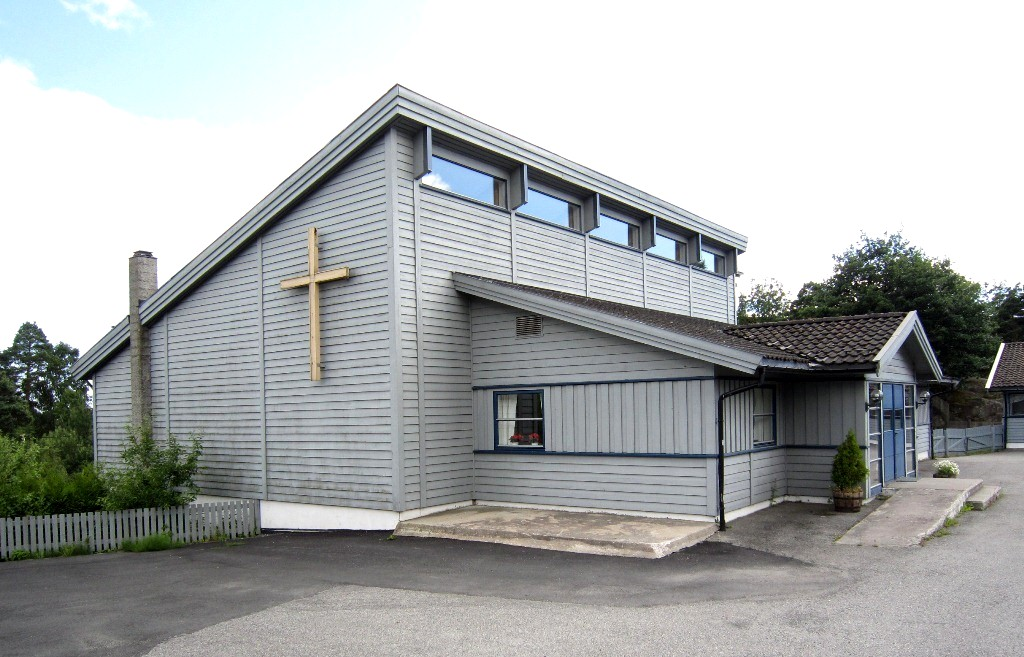
- View of the village church
- Interactive map of Helle
- Coordinates: 58.9035°N 9.39052°E
- Country: Norway
- Region: Eastern Norway
- County: Telemark
- District: Vestmar
- Municipality: Kragerø Municipality

Area
  - Total: 1.23 km^{2} (0.47 sq mi)
- Elevation: 12 m (39 ft)

Population (2025)
  - Total: 1,501
  - Density: 1,220/km^{2} (3,200/sq mi)
- Data for "Vadfoss/Helle"
- Time zone: UTC+01:00 (CET)
  - Summer (DST): UTC+02:00 (CEST)
- Post Code: 3790 Helle

Helle is a village in Kragerø Municipality in Telemark county, Norway. The village is located on the north shores of Hellefjorden about 7 km (4.3 mi) northeast of the town of Kragerø. The village of Vadfoss is located immediately west of Helle. The village of Helle includes the neighborhoods of Nordbø, Sollia, Måneliheia, and Skarbo. There are several small lakes in the hills above Helle, including Upper and Lower Strandtjenn, Langtjenn, Bastautjenn, Årømyrtjenna, and Svarttjenn.

The villages of Vadfoss and Helle have grown together in conurbation, so Statistics Norway groups them together as one large urban village called Vadfoss/Helle. The 1.23-square-kilometre (300-acre) village area of Vadfoss/Helle has a population (2025) of 1,501 and a population density of 1,220 inhabitants per square kilometre (3,200/sq mi).

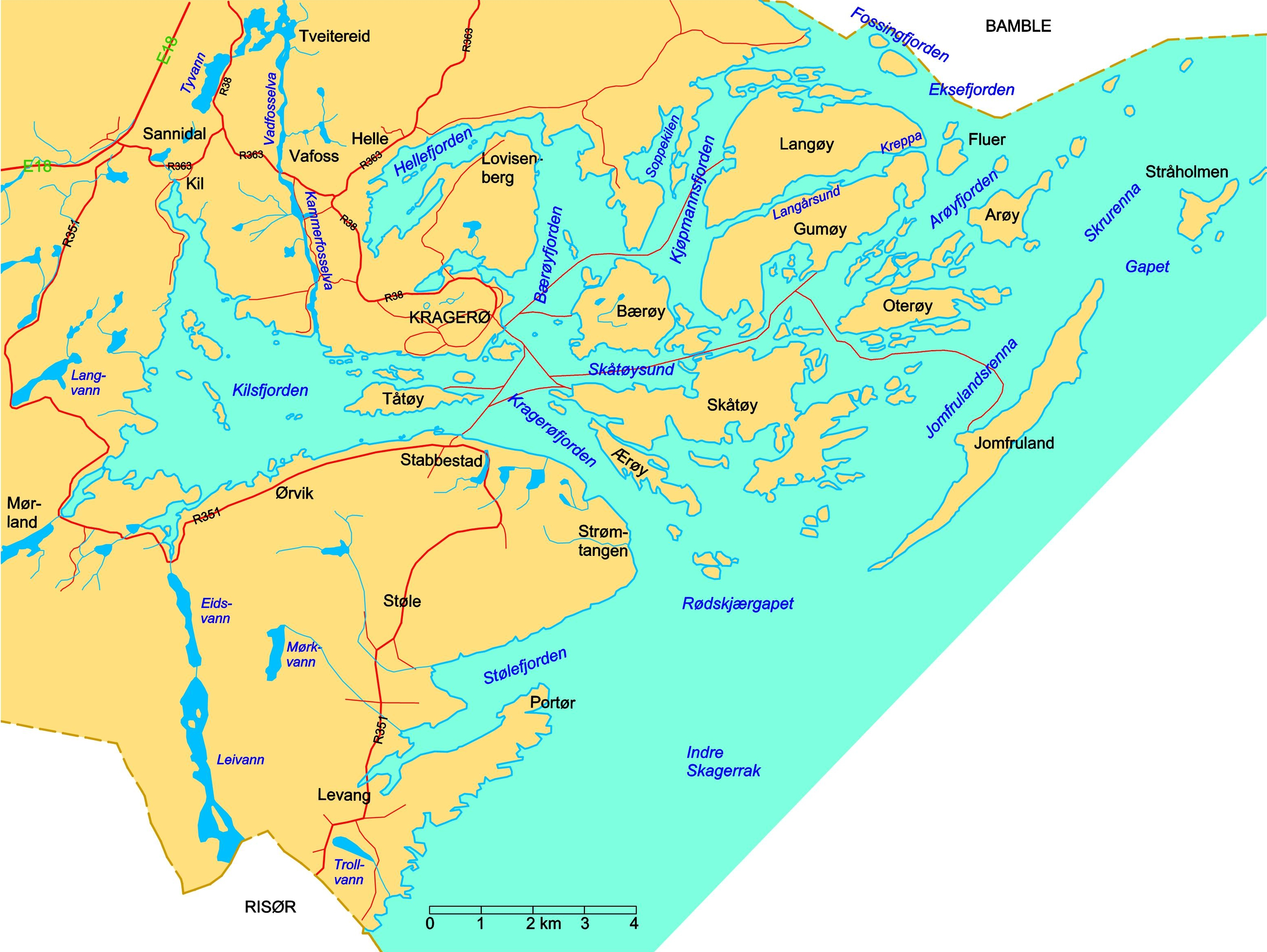
A closeup of the Kragerø archipelago. Helle is in the upper right of this map.

The village is connected to the rest of Norway via road by Norwegian county roads 363 and 210, and via bus by Nettbuss Sør Route 459 and Drangedal Bilruter Route 609. The nearest highway is the European route E18, which passes through Kil, about 7 kilometres (4.3 mi) to the west.

== History ==
Helle started out as an industrial community when the Helle Bruk sawmill was built in 1580. The sawmill was in continuous operation until 1930 when it was shut down. The village was also known for its ice harvesting industry, and at one point it had three different companies exporting ice from the area. There was also a chains factory in the Skarbo neighborhood with about 45 employees that was founded in 1909. It was in continuous operation up until 2005 when the company moved operations to an industrial park on the border of Kragerø Municipality and Drangedal Municipality just north of the E18 highway.

Today, Helle is largely a residential community, with the exception of a few businesses on Helleveien. In the Sollia neighborhood, there is a small wooden church, Helle Church, which was built in 1994. The church includes a kindergarten, a kitchen, multiple meeting rooms, and a chapel with 200 seats. There was formerly a small post office in the village center, but it closed around the turn of the millennium. In 2008, a large new elementary school, Helleskolen, was built in the Nordbø neighborhood to replace Årø School and Skarbo School. It houses about 200 students and includes sports facilities such as an artificial turf field.
