= Helle Church =

Church in Telemark, Norway

- Helle kirke
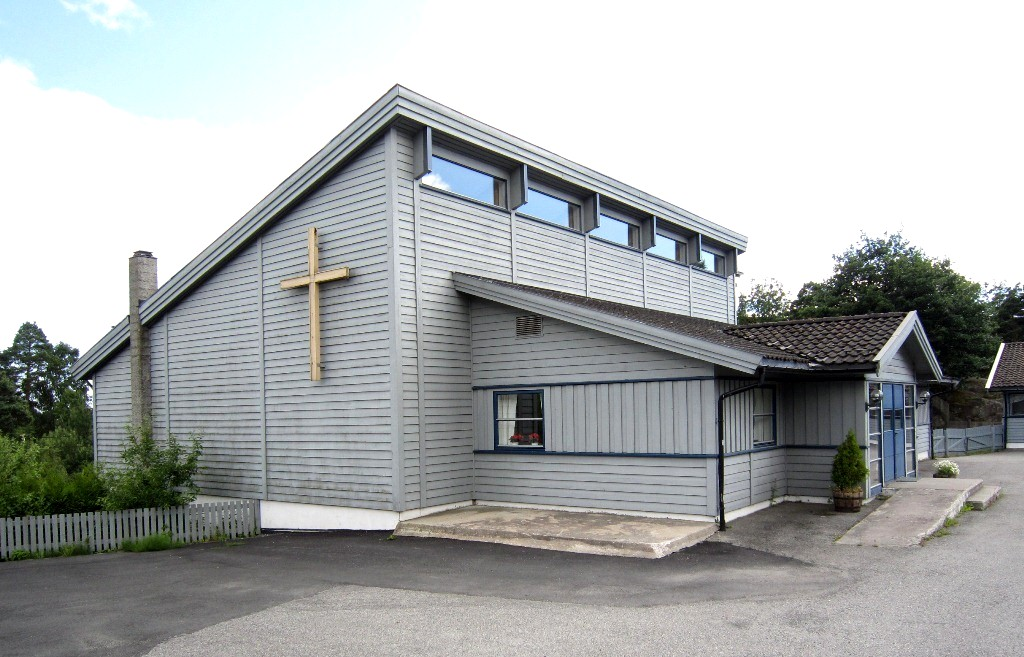
- View of the church
- Helle Church
- 58°53′56″N 9°22′14″E
- Location: Kragerø Municipality, Telemark
- Country: Norway
- Denomination: Church of Norway
- Churchmanship: Evangelical Lutheran

History
- Status: Parish church
- Founded: 1981
- Consecrated: 1986

Architecture
- Functional status: Active
- Architect: Morten Lunøe
- Architectural type: Long church
- Completed: 1981 (45 years ago)

Specifications
- Capacity: 200
- Materials: Wood

Administration
- Diocese: Agder og Telemark
- Deanery: Bamble prosti
- Parish: Helle

Helle Church (Norwegian: Helle kirke) is a parish church of the Church of Norway in Kragerø Municipality in Telemark county, Norway. It is located in the village of Helle. It is the church for the Helle parish which is part of the Bamble prosti (deanery) in the Diocese of Agder og Telemark. The gray, wooden church was built in a long church design in 1981 using plans drawn up by the architect Morten Lunøe. The church seats about 200 people.

== History ==
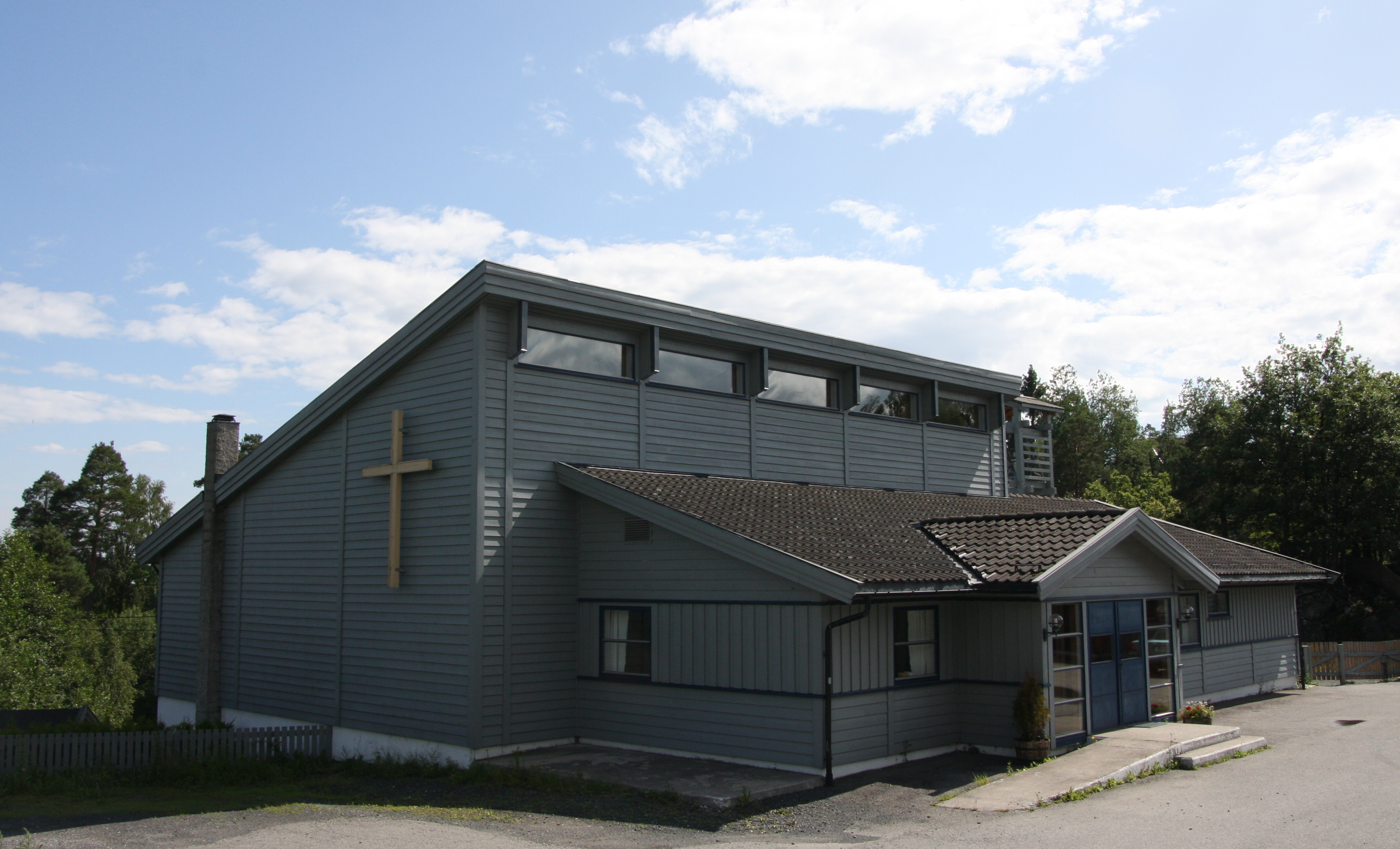
View of the church

Around 1980, John Strand donated land for a chapel in Helle. The concrete and wood building was constructed in two stages. The first stage was designed by Morten Lunøe and it was built in 1981. It was set up as an annex chapel under the Sannidal Church parish. The building was not formally consecrated until 1986. The second stage of construction, enlarged the building by adding a church hall, kitchen, and other meeting rooms. This project was completed in 1994, with the formal re-consecration of the chapel in December 1994. In 2000, a bell tower was constructed. In 2010, the chapel was upgraded to a parish church and it was renamed Helle Church.

== See also ==
- List of churches in Agder og Telemark
