= Krąg =

Krąg may refer to the following places:

- Krąg, Kuyavian-Pomeranian Voivodeship (north-central Poland)
- Krąg, Pomeranian Voivodeship (north Poland)
- Krąg, West Pomeranian Voivodeship (north-west Poland)

== See also ==
- Krag (disambiguation)
