= Gillian Pederson-Krag =

American artist

- Born: 1938 (age 86–87); New York City, United States
- Education: BFA Rhode Island School of Design, MFA Cornell University
- Known for: painting, etching
- Website: Artist's website

Gillian Pederson-Krag is a contemporary American artist. She was born in New York City in 1938, and lives and works in Santa Cruz, California.

== Background ==
Krag received her B.F.A from the Rhode Island School of Design in Providence in 1961 and her M.F.A from Cornell University in Ithaca in 1963, where she also taught painting and drawing from 1966-1979. Her works can be found in the collections of the Fine Arts Museum of San Francisco, The New York Public Library Print Collection, the Library of Congress Print Collection, and the Herbert F. Johnson Museum of Art at Cornell University, among others.

In 2004, Krag was the Frances Niederer artist-in-residence at Hollins University. She gave a collection of etching prints to the Eleanor D. Wilson Museum, which then became a part of the museum's permanent collection.

== Selected solo and group exhibitions ==
- The Poetry of Content: Five Contemporary Representational Artists, December 30, 2015 - March 20, 2016. SUArt Galleries, Shaffer Art Building at Syracuse University. Syracuse, NY.
- Gillian Pederson-Krag: Paintings & Etchings, November 13, 2014 - November 30, 2014. Peter Paul Luce Gallery, McWethy Hall, Cornell College. Mt Vernon, IA.
- Gillian Pederson-Krag, November 2, 2006 - January 6, 2007. Eleanor D. Wilson Museum, Hollins University. Roanoke, VA.
