= Kilsfjorden, Telemark =

Fjord in Kragerø, Telemark, Norway

Kilsfjorden
- Kilsfjord (unofficial)
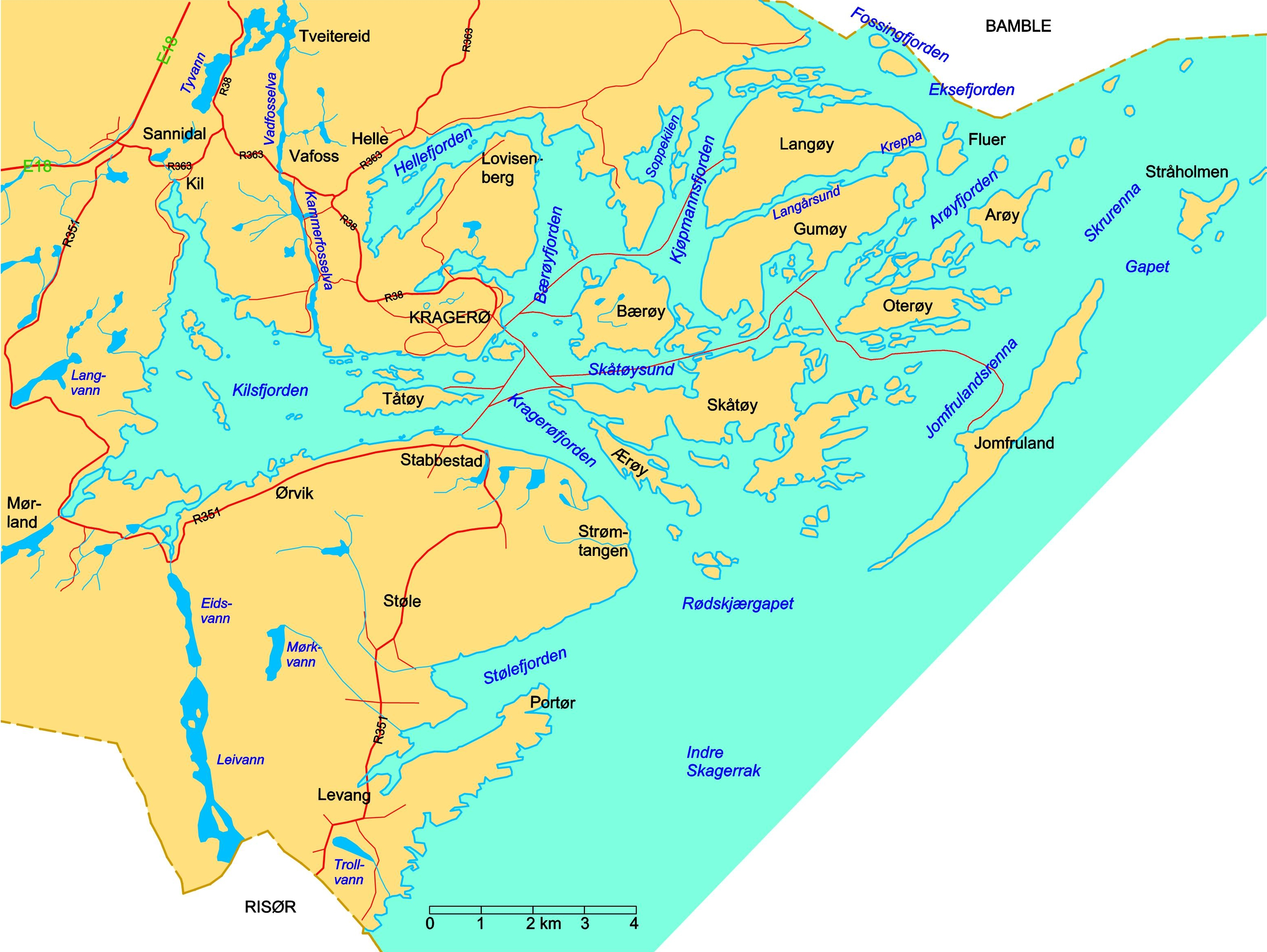
- Map of the Kragerø area
- Interactive map of the fjord
- Location: Telemark county, Norway
- Coordinates: 58.85795°N 9.33005°E
- Type: Fjord
- Primary outflows: Kragerøfjorden
- Basin countries: Norway

Kilsfjorden is a fjord in Kragerø Municipality in Telemark county, Norway. It is one of the inner fjords that flow out into the main Kragerøfjorden. The Kilsfjorden extends west from Tåtøy, an island in the archipelago just south of the town of Kragerø. The fjord goes in a westerly direction from Tåtøy and it broadens further in. It then turns to the north and narrows sharply again, before ending at the village of Kil at the head of the fjord.

The Kragerø River (Kragerøvassdraget) flows into the north eastern side of the fjord, about three miles west of the town of Kragerø. Highway 351 follows the south side of the fjord.

== See also ==
- List of Norwegian fjords
