= Vilhelm Uchermann =

Norwegian physician and otorhinolaryngologist

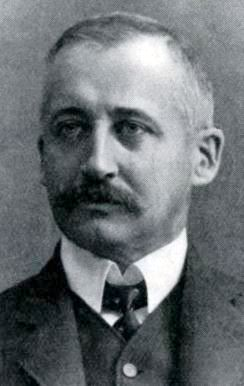
- Born: 23 November 1852; Aamot, Norway
- Died: 24 February 1929 (aged 76)
- Occupations: Physician, otorhinolaryngologist
- Employer: University of Oslo
- Relatives: Karl Uchermann (cousin)

Vilhelm Uchermann (23 November 1852 – 24 February 1929) was a Norwegian physician, and the first otorhinolaryngologist in Norway.

He was born in Aamot Municipality in Hedmark county, to physician Wilhelm Hansen Heiberg Uchermann and Emilie Leganger. He was a cousin of painter Karl Uchermann, and uncle of illustrator and actor Thoralf Klouman.

Uchermann graduated as cand.med. in 1876. He specialized in both skin diseases and otorhinolaryngology. From 1895 to 1922 he was appointed professor at the University of Oslo. Among his publications are Lægebog for Sømænd from 1889, his doctoral thesis De døvstumme i Norge (two volumes, 1892–1896), and Illustreret lægebok for hjemmet from 1917. He edited the journal Tidsskrift for praktisk Medicin, a forerunner of the Journal of the Norwegian Medical Association. He was decorated as Knight, First Class of the Order of St. Olav in 1899. He died in Oslo in 1929.
