= Kragh =

Kragh is a surname. Notable people with the surname include:

- Anna Magdalene Kragh (1819–1903), Danish-Norwegian poet and playwright
- Brian Kragh, Danish sprint kayaker
- Helge Kragh (born 1944), Danish historian of science
- Inger Kragh (1915–2004), Danish/Norwegian sports swimmer and diver
- Jens Nielsen Kragh (1729–1773), Danish West Indies colonial administrator
