= Erik Krag =

Norwegian literary historian, translator, novelist and playwright

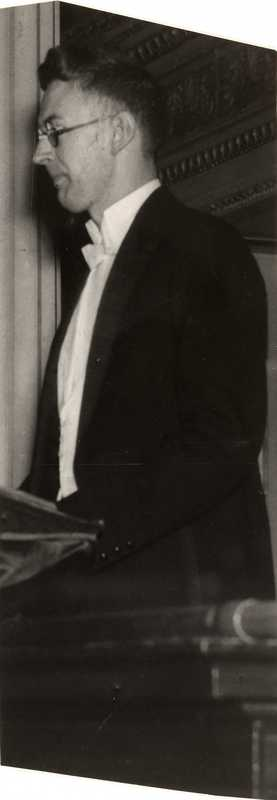
- Born: 13 January 1902; Copenhagen, Denmark
- Died: 13 May 1987 (aged 85)
- Occupations: literary historian, translator, novelist and playwright
- Parent: Thomas Krag

Erik Krag (13 January 1902 – 13 May 1987) was a Norwegian literary historian, translator, novelist and playwright. He was born in Copenhagen, a son of novelist Thomas Krag and poet Iben Nielsen. Krag is known as the founder of Slavic literary history as academic discipline in Norway. He was a professor at the University of Oslo from 1946 to 1969. His monography Dostojevskij from 1962 was translated into English in 1976, and he has also published works on Leo Tolstoi and on Russian theatre.

== Selected works ==
- Ottar Wreike (1922)
- Leo Tolstoj (1937)
- En liten manns bryllup (1952)
- Dostojevskij (1962)
- Den barnløse (1966)
