= Gudmund Schnitler =

Norwegian war historian

Gudmund Schnitler (10 June 1868 – 4 November 1925) was a Norwegian military officer and war historian. He was born in Oslo as the son of military officer and historian Didrik Thomas Johannes Schnitler. Among his publications is a continuation of his father's series Almindelig krigshistorie (volume 5, published in 1905, covering the period from 1650 to 1792). His book on World War I, Verdenskrigen 1914–18 from 1924, has been translated into several languages.
