= Lul Krag =

Norwegian painter

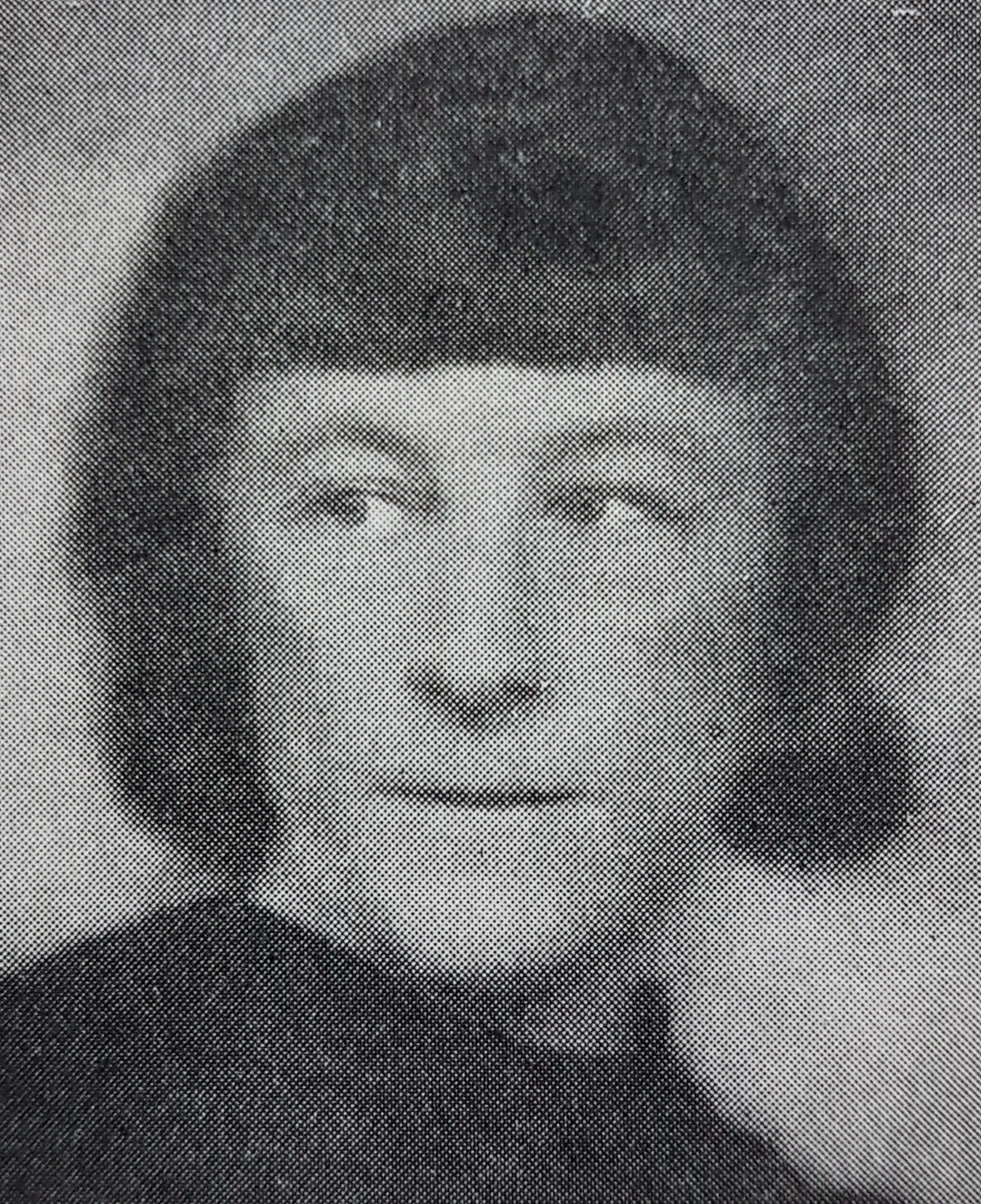
- Born: Karen Marie Krag; 7 February 1878; Kongsberg, Norway
- Died: 9 July 1956 (aged 78); Oslo, Norway
- Occupation: Painter
- Father: Ole Herman Johannes Krag

Lul Krag (7 February 1878 – 9 July 1956) was a Norwegian painter. She is best known for her landscape paintings from Rosendal.

== Biography ==
She was born in Kongsberg, a daughter of Colonel Ole Krag (1837–1916) and Elise Theodora Collett (1844–1926). Krag first began painting at the age of 20 as a student of Harriet Backer. She studied with Christian Krohg at the Académie Colarossi. In 1933 she moved to Rosendal. She lived a secluded life and did not exhibit her work. In 1954 she moved to Oslo, where she died two years later.

She is represented at the National Gallery of Norway with the charcoal drawings Løvtrær og kirke, Blomster i parken, and Fjell med bre.
