= Vilhelm Krag =

Norwegian poet, writer, journalist and cultural personality

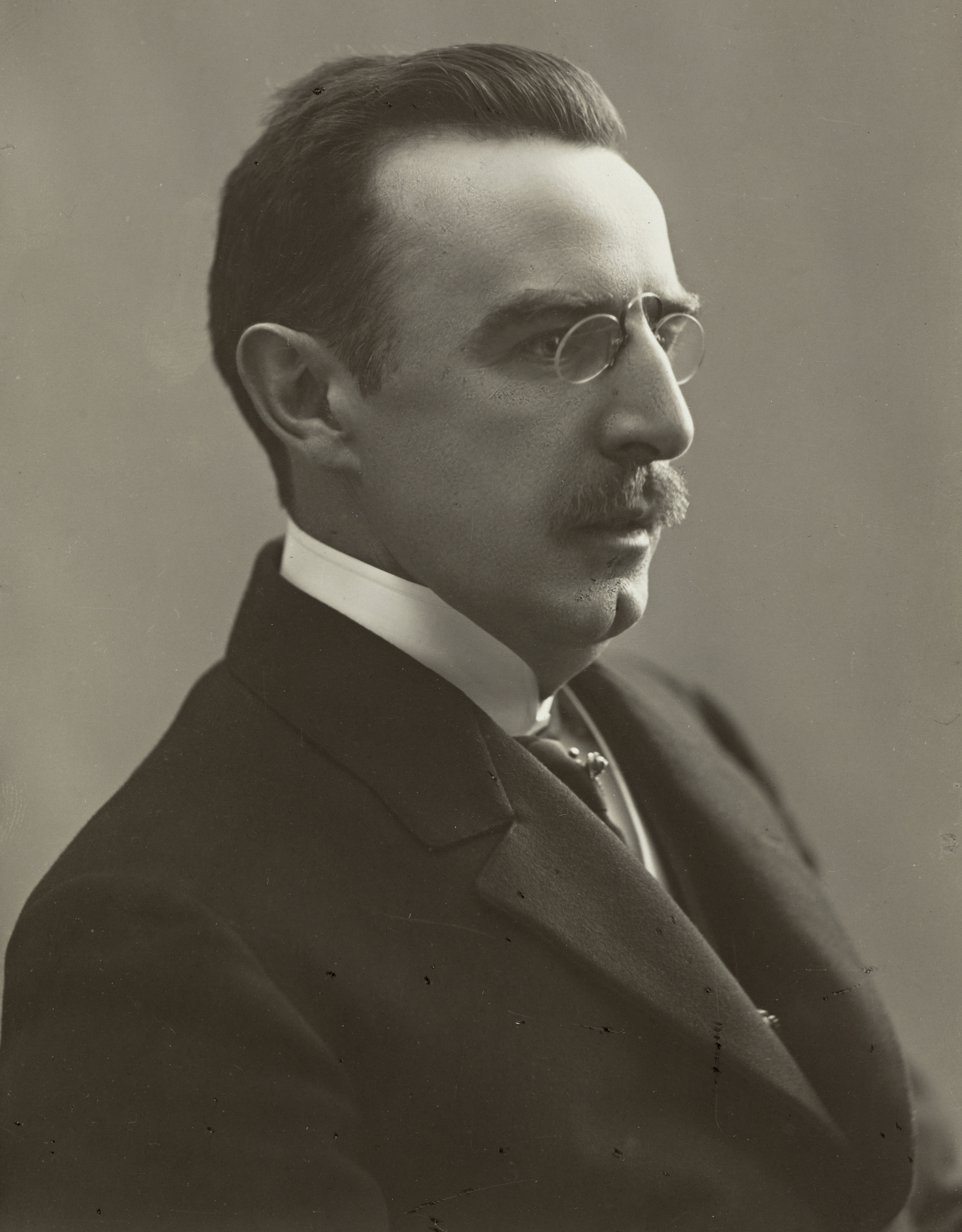
Portrait of Vilhelm Krag

Vilhelm Krag (24 December 1871 – 10 July 1933) was a Norwegian poet, writer, journalist and cultural personality. Known for coining the term Sørlandet to describe a region of Norway, he was the son of Peter Rasmus Krag and younger brother of the novelist Thomas Krag.

His first volume of poetry, which came out in 1891, included many of his best-known poems: "Fandango", "Der skreg en fugl" (A bird cried), "Liden Kirsten" (Little Kirsten), "Majnat" (May night), "Mens jeg venter" (While I'm waiting), "Moderen synger" (The mother sings) and "Og jeg vil ha mig en hjertenskjær" (And I will have me a sweetheart).

Edvard Grieg set Krag's lyrics to music in his Opus 60, published in 1894. In the early 20th century works by Krag were recorded in America by Florence Bodinoff, George Hamlin, Nathalie Hansen, Eleonora Olson, Ernestine Schumann-Heink, Aalrud Tillisch, and Carsten Woll.

Cultural offices
| Preceded by Bjørn Bjørnson | Director of the National Theatre; 1908–1911 | Succeeded by Halfdan Christensen |
