= Peter Rasmus Krag =

Norwegian politician

Peter Rasmus Krag (12 May 1825 – 16 April 1891) was a Norwegian engineer captain in the Norwegian Army, chief-of-roads and politician. He sat as a member of the Parliament of Norway for several terms. His two brothers, Hans Hagerup Krag and Ole Herman Johannes Krag were also engineers, as was their great uncle Rasmus Krag

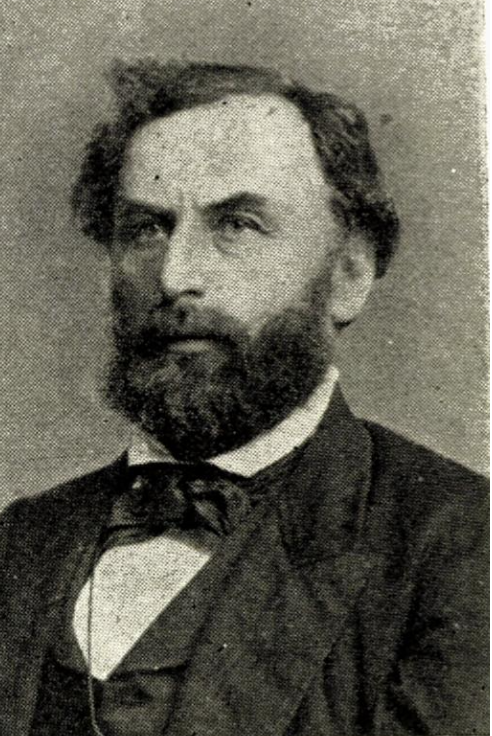
Peter Rasmus Krag

Peter Rasmus Krag, formerly chief engineer in the roads department, died 16 April 1891 in Kristiana (modern day Oslo) after an illness of some duration.

Peter Rasmus Krag, born 12 May 1825, became a Norwegian army officer in 1844, took the exams for artillery and engineering in 1847 and was already a volunteer in the roads department in 1848. He worked with this department almost continuously beside his military career until 1889, when ill health forced his retirement. His coughing forced the end of his military career in 1890 when he retired to live in Kristiana with an annual pension of 2,500 kroner granted by parliament.

Engineer Captain Krag was a man with many interests and a strong work ethic. He worked to further many of the more important interests of society and was not just a military and road engineer but also a politician when he was elected and re-elected as a member of the Norwegian parliament. The largest part of his efforts, and his best years, were in the service of the Roads Department where he was indefatigable in his energy, his initiative and his expertise. It was particularly in southern Norway – in the districts of Lister and Mandals – that roads and bridges were developed under his supervision – an approximate combined length of 300 kilometers. The work and travel proved very strenuous, which contributed greatly to the illness which forced his retirement.

Amongst his greater achievements were roads in

- Kongsberg
- Laurvig to Porsgrund
- Flekkefjord to Siredalen
- Kristianssand to its hinterland
- Bridgeworks in Lyngdal
- Bridgeworks in the valley of Mandal

Krag recognised the necessity for good communications, not only of roads and bridges but also railways. In parliament he supported and promoted over a number of years, the building of the Seterdal railway which earned him an official “Thankyou” from that district.

On his death, Krag was survived by his widow, Fredrikke Fyhn, and his seven children including the writers Vilhelm Krag. and his brother Thomas Peter Krag

== Citations ==
(in Norwegian)Projekt Runeberg - Peter Rasmus Krag
