= Ole Herman Johannes Krag =

Norwegian officer and firearms designer

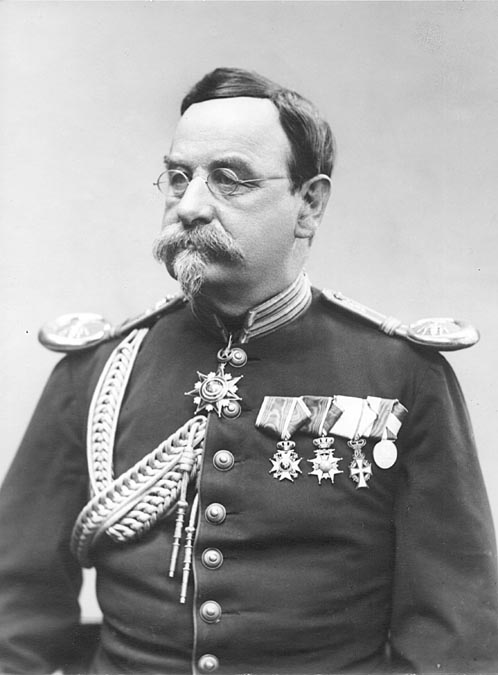
- Ole Herman Johannes Krag
- Born: Ole Herman Johannes Krag; 7 April 1837; Vaage, Christians amt, Norway
- Died: 9 December 1916 (aged 79); Paris, France
- Occupation: Inventor
- Spouse: Karen Elise Theodora Collett
- Children: Lul Krag; Herman Anton Johan Krag
- Relatives: Herman Krag, brothers Peter Rasmus Krag and Hans Hagerup Krag. Also, great uncle Rasmus Krag.

Ole Herman Johannes Krag (7 April 1837 – 9 December 1916) was a Norwegian officer and firearms designer.

== Biography ==
Ole H. J. Krag was born in Vaage (now spelled Vågå) in Christians amt (county), Norway. Krag grew up in various locations where his father, Hans Peter Schnitler Krag (1794–1855), served as pastor at churches in Vaage (Vågå), Fredrikshald (Halden), and Christiania (Oslo). Krag was a student at Hartvig Nissens skole in Oslo.

He started his military career in January 1854. He became a second lieutenant in 1857 and a full lieutenant in 1861. In 1866 he was ordered to Kongsberg Våpenfabrikk, the most important Norwegian weapons factory of its day.

Ole H J Krag constructed his first repeating rifle in 1868, which evolved into the Krag–Petersson (aided by Axel Petersson) by 1872. This, as well as his work in the armoury, gave him a thorough understanding of what requirements the Norwegian Army had to a rifle, allowing him to create the successful Krag–Jørgensen with the help of his good friend Erik Jørgensen.

He designed a wide range of firearms during his lifetime, but only two – the Krag–Petersson and the Krag–Jørgensen – were adopted by any armed forces. Fewer than 1,000 Krag–Petersson rifles were made for the Royal Norwegian Navy, while several hundreds of thousands Krag–Jørgensen rifles were made for the Danish, Norwegian and US armies.

In 1880 he was named director of the armoury. After the Krag–Jørgensen was accepted as the main rifle of the Norwegian Army, he was made a lieutenant colonel in 1894.

== Personal life ==
In 1870, Krag married Karen Elise Theodora Collett (1844-1926). They were the parents of Lul Krag, and of lawyer Herman Anton Johan Krag (1871–1931), and in turn the grandparents of architect Herman Krag (1920-1982).

Ole Krag retired in 1902. He is honored in Kongsberg with a street named Krags gate. He died in Paris in December 1916 and was buried in Oslo in January 1917.
