= Rasmus Krag (1763–1838) =

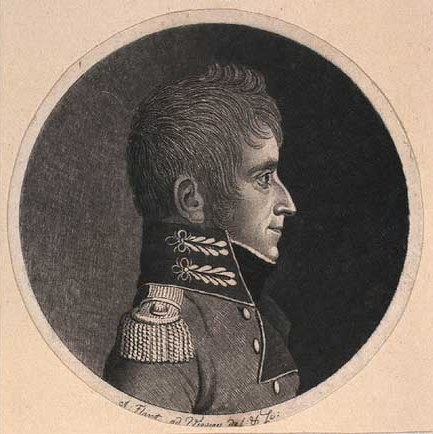
- Rasmus Krag by Andreas Flint
- Born: Rasmus Krag; 9 August 1763; Surendahl, Trondheim
- Died: 3 January 1838 (aged 74); Copenhagen
- Occupation: Military Engineer
- Relatives: great nephews Peter Rasmus Krag, Ole Herman Johannes Krag, and Hans Hagerup Krag.
- Honours: Grand Cross of the Order of the Dannebrog

Rasmus Krag (1763–1838) was a military officer and engineer in the service of Denmark-Norway and, after the Treaty of Kiel, just Denmark.

== Personal ==
Born 9 August 1763 in Surendal district near Trondheim in Norway Rasmus Krag was the son of a major in the 2nd Trondheim infantry regiment. After studying mathematics in Christiania (modern-day Oslo), he entered the Artillery School in 1780 and became a bombardier (corporal) in the artillery corps. In 1784 he was commissioned as a junior lieutenant in the engineer corps and involved with defence works and other building in Norway–partly in Christiansand, partly at Frederiksværn and Laurvig.

== Foreign Service ==
Impressed by Krag's abilities, General W v. Huth approved, in 1793, his application for foreign service. He served for a short time with the Austrian troops under the Prince of Coburg at the Siege of Valenciennes (1793) and with the Prussian army and later with the Dutch army as a supernumerary on the general staff of the Prince of Orange in the War of the First Coalition against the French. In Dutch service, he was later appointed as an engineer and aide-general quartermaster, in which capacity he saw service on campaign for two years at Menin, Maubeuge, Cambrai and Landrecies, Gosselies, Jumet, and Fleuru.

During his time outside Denmark, he was promoted to senior lieutenant in the engineer corps, and after the 1795 peace between France and Holland, he returned to Denmark and his military career there.

== 1795–1801 ==
Further promotions in the infantry and the engineer corps followed. From 1797 to 1801 he was an engineer on the defence works at Nyborg and Korsør (both on the Great Belt) and was named as generalquartermaster-lieutenant in 1798.

== 1801–1809 ==
On the outbreak of hostilities with Britain in the spring of 1801, Rasmus Krag was appointed as adjutant to the commander of the island of Funen, a position which he held with several breaks until 1808. He was an engineer at Nyborg Castle and laid out the plans for the Knudshoved battery in its outer defences in his first year there.

In 1803 with a promotion to captain of engineers, he acted as general quartermaster-lieutenant with the troops gathered at Rendsborg, in 1804 at Glückstadt fortress, and in 1805–1806 with the troops in Holstein. He was further promoted in 1807 as a major in the Infantry and early in 1808 as a lieutenant-colonel on the newly formed general quartermaster staff.

In 1809 he was named commander of the Danish Engineer detachment (later called the Danish Engineer Brigade) which at that time comprised Danish, Norwegian, and Holstein brigades.

== Head of the Engineering Corps ==
From 1809 he was a member of Copenhagen's Water Commission, and in 1811 (until 1834) head of the Copenhagen Fire Department. As a colonel in the infantry from 1810, and lieutenant-colonel of engineers from 1816. From 4 September 1818, he was recognised as head of the engineer corps and was further promoted to lieutenant general in 1836. Under his leadership of the corps of engineers, the corps undertook many technical functions including road building, harbours and lighthouse inspections and many of his officers became experts in these fields which remained a military function until 1868 when they came under civil control. His groundwork in the training of engineer officers furthered the work of developing the railways.

== Honours and death ==
Krag became a Knight of the Order of the Dannebrog in 1812 and rose through the levels of that honour to Grand Cross in 1829. Struck by a sudden illness on 3 January 1838, he collapsed near the Frederiksholms Canal in Copenhagen just as the future King Christian IX was passing. He was taken to the cavalry barracks where he soon expired.

He is buried in the Garrison Cemetery, Copenhagen. A miniature portrait by Friedrich Carl Gröger is in family possession, and also an engraving by Andreas Flint. (Note: da:Andreas Flint, not to be confused with Andreas Flinch who was a later Danish lithographer)

== Citations ==
- (in Danish)Projekt Runeberg in Dansk Biografisk Leksikon Vol 9 pp 444-446 - Rasmus Krag
- (in Danish)Rockstroh K.C.: Rasmus Krag in Dansk Biografisk Leksikon, 3 ed., Gyldendal 1979–84. Accessed 20 February 2020

== See also ==
https://snl.no/Krag_-_slekter
