= Didrik Thomas Johannes Schnitler =

Didrik Thomas Johannes Schnitler (9 September 1833 – 15 December 1888) was a Norwegian military officer and war historian.

== Personal life ==
He was born in Østre Toten, as the son of military officer Balthasar Schnitler (died 1840) and Bolette Rogneby. He married Nanni Cathrine Sidonia Gudmundson (1833–1901) in 1859, and was the father of military officer and historian Gudmund Schnitler.

== Career ==
Schnitler graduated from the Norwegian Military Academy in 1854, and went on to study at the Norwegian Military College, where he graduated in 1858. His first assignment was at the Bergenhusiske gevorbne Musketerkorps in Bergen. He served at the 2nd Akershusiske Brigade, and then at Kanalvæsenet. From 1859 he was assigned to the General Staff, where he had the title of Adjoint from 1864. He gained the rank of captain in 1872, and was given a special post as military historian in 1876. He was promoted to the rank of lieutenant colonel in 1882. He was a teacher of military history at both of his alma maters, the Norwegian Military Academy and the Norwegian Military College.

His main work is the four-volume series Almindelig krigshistorie ("General War History"), published between 1878 and 1885. The series is an expanded version of works originally written for his lectures at the Military Academy. Volume I covered the Ancient Greek and Macedonian period, volume II covered the Roman period, volume III covered Medieval warfare, and volume IV covered the period up to 1650. A fifth volume, based on his manuscripts, covering the period from 1650 to 1792, was completed and published by his son, Gudmund, in 1905.

He was a member of the editorial board of the periodical Norskt militært Tidsskrift. He was the secretary of the Military Commission of 1869, a member of the Military Education Commission from 1870 to 1872, and a member of the Commission of 1884, which had been given the mandate of preparing for the reorganization of the Norwegian Army.

A selection of his articles originally published in various magazines was published in 1895 as Blade af Norges krigshistorie. He was decorated as a Knight of the Order of St. Olav in 1880, and was also a Knight of the Swedish Order of the Sword and Order of the Polar Star, and the Prussian Order of the Crown.
