= Hans Hagerup Krag =

Norwegian engineer (1829–1907)

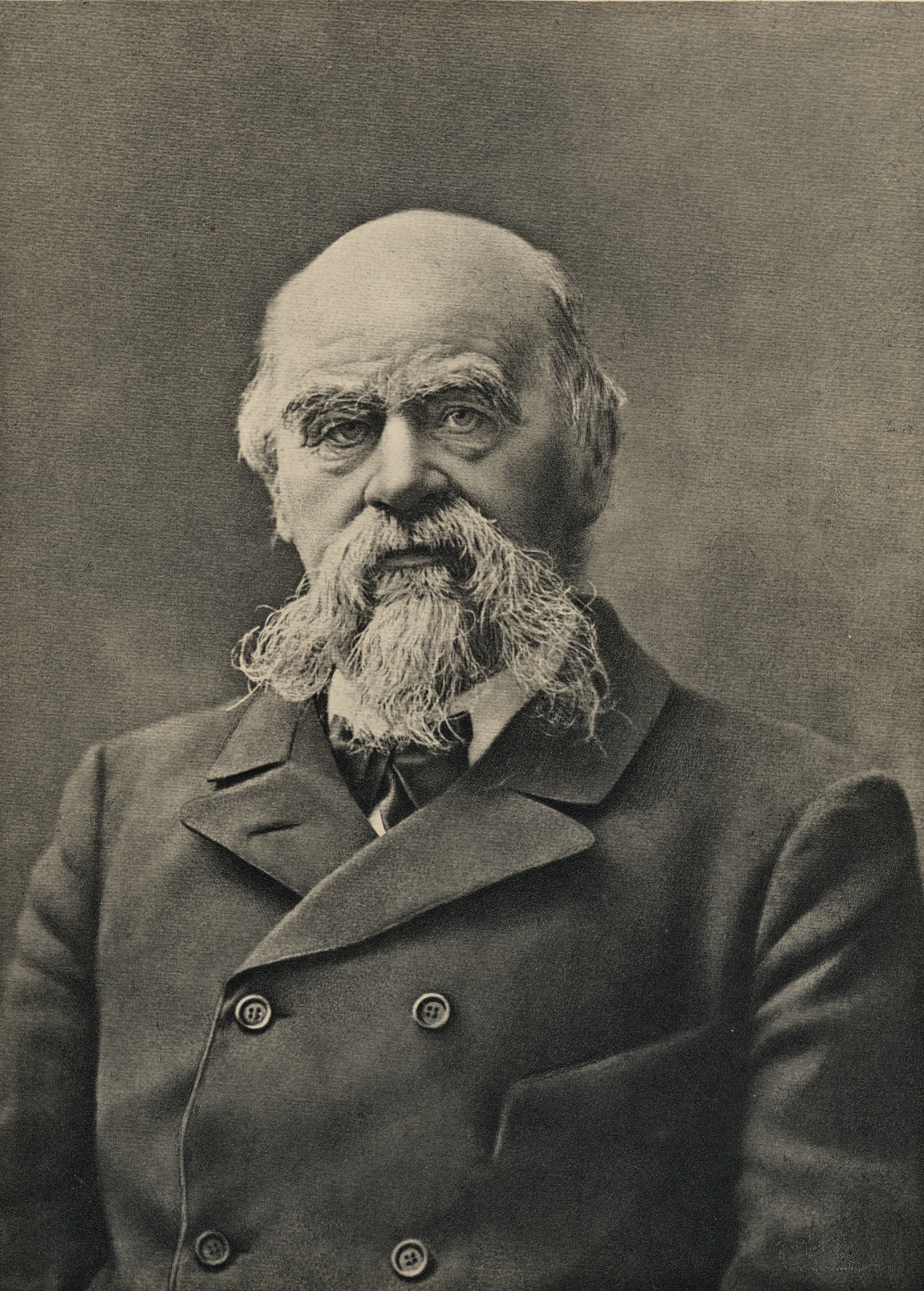
- Hans Hagerup Krag
- Born: Hans Hagerup Krag; 9 August 1829
- Died: 8 May 1907 (aged 77)
- Occupation: Director of Roads
- Relatives: brothers Peter Rasmus Krag and Ole Herman Johannes Krag. Also, great uncle Rasmus Krag.

Hans Hagerup Krag (9 August 1829 – 8 May 1907) was a Norwegian engineer.

He was hired as an engineer in the Norwegian Public Roads Administration in 1852, and served as director of the Norwegian Directorate of Public Roads from 1874 to 1903. Also, together with Thomas Heftye he founded the Norwegian Mountain Touring Association in 1868. From 1879 to 1883 and 1893 to 1895 he was chairman of the Norwegian Polytechnic Society.

Preceded by Chr. W. Berg	Director of the Norwegian Directorate of Public Roads; 1874–1903	Succeeded by Johan Kristian Skougaard
Preceded by Hans Jacob Rosenørn Grüner	Chairman of the Norwegian Polytechnic Society; 1879–1883	Succeeded by Albert Fenger-Krog
Preceded by Knud Bryn	Chairman of the Norwegian Polytechnic Society; 1893–1895	Succeeded by E. Lund
