= Kragerø (town) =

Town in Kragerø, Norway

- Town/City
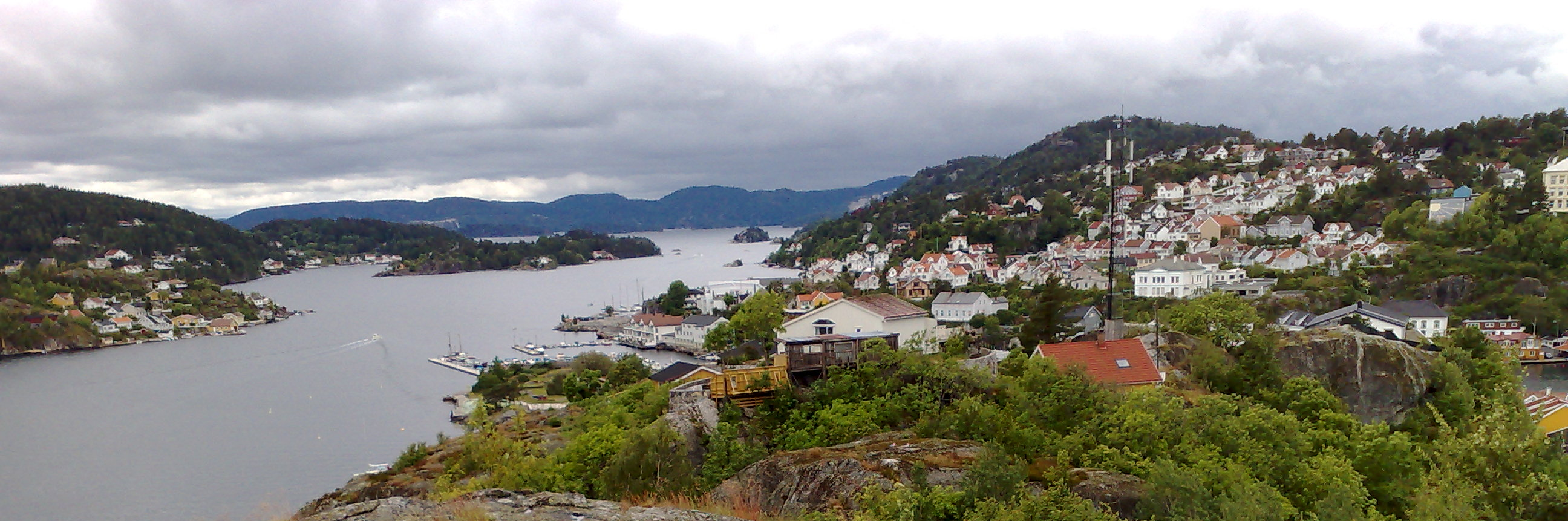
- View of the town
- Interactive map of Kragerø
- Coordinates: 58.8693°N 9.41493°E
- Country: Norway
- Region: Eastern Norway
- County: Telemark
- District: Vestmar
- Municipality: Kragerø Municipality
- Established as
- Kjøpstad: 1666

Area
  - Total: 3.35 km^{2} (1.29 sq mi)
- Elevation: 1 m (3.3 ft)

Population (2025)
  - Total: 5,501
  - Density: 1,642/km^{2} (4,250/sq mi)
- Time zone: UTC+01:00 (CET)
  - Summer (DST): UTC+02:00 (CEST)
- Post Code: 3770 Kragerø

Kragerø (Norwegian pronunciation: [ˈkrɑ̀ːɡərœ]) is a town that is the administrative centre of Kragerø Municipality in Telemark county, Norway. The town is located on the shore of the Kilsfjord, about 5 kilometres (3.1 mi) to the southeast of the villages of Vadfoss and Helle. Kragerø Church is located in the town centre.

The 3.35-square-kilometre (830-acre) town has a population (2025) of 5,501 and a population density of 1,642 inhabitants per square kilometre (4,250/sq mi).

== History ==
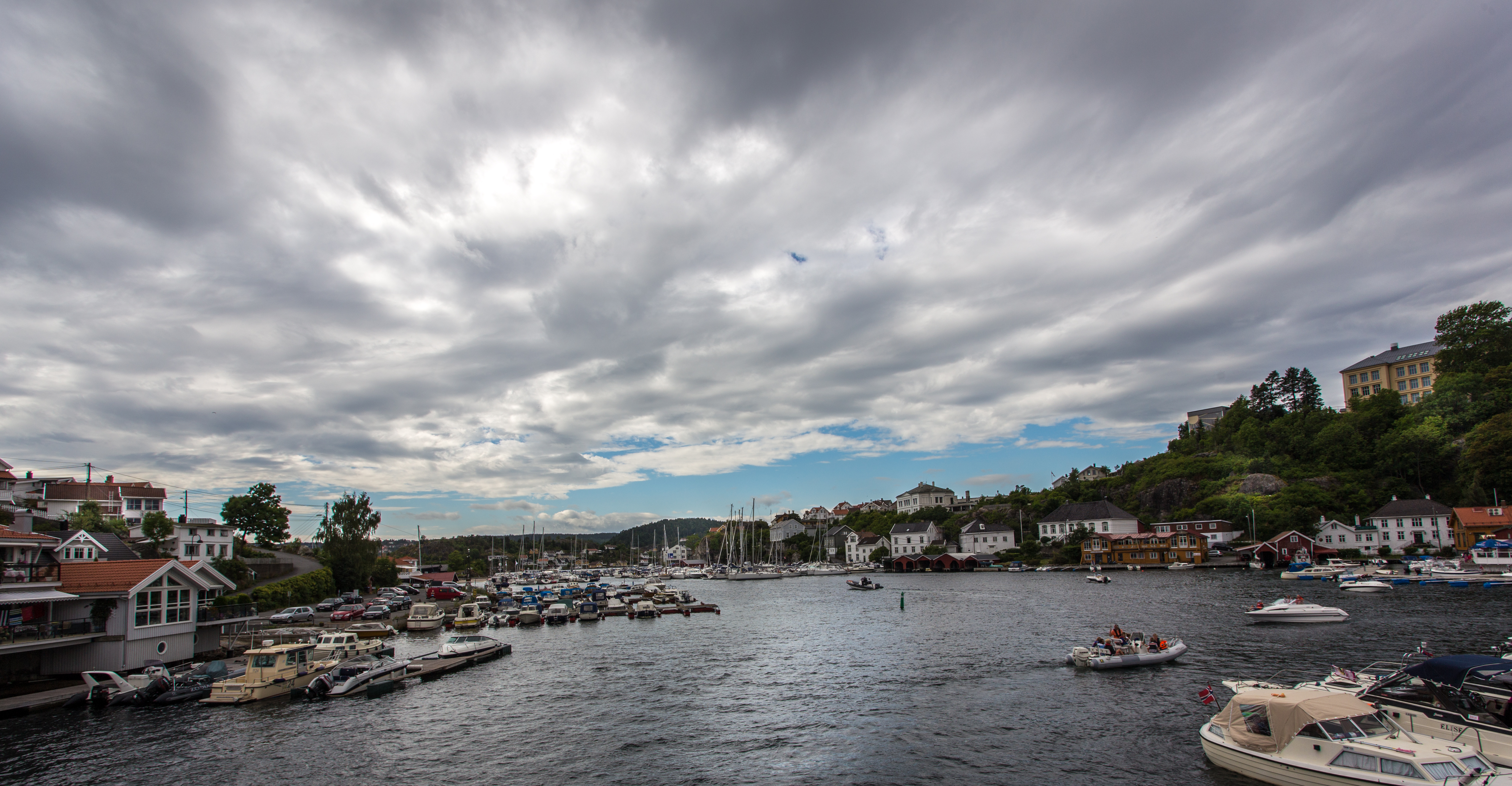
View of the town

Kragerø is located at the end of a peninsula between the Kilsfjord and Hellefjorden. The peninsula to the south, the island of Skåtøy, and several other large islands provide for a sheltered harbor for the town. By the 1500, this area began to grow up as an important harbour for shipping timber from the vast forests of Telemark. In 1666, the village was established as a kjøpstad, giving it "town" rights. The town's business life was characterized by timber exports, shipping, and shipbuilding from then until the end of the First World War. Kragerø was one of Norway's largest shipping towns in the latter half of the 19th century. In addition to timber, later came shipping of wood pulp and products from quarries in the upland.

=== 1694 murder ===
On 17 August 1694, Christian Hansen Ernst was killed at the present-day Knivstikkersmauet ("knife stabber alley"). He was an employee of the postal service, and a former servant of Ulrik Fredrik Gyldenløve. He was one of few Africans of the time living in Norway, whose identity is known.

== Government ==
In Norway, municipalities are the unit of local government. This means that cities and towns are simply designations for urban areas, but under current Norwegian law, they have no actual government authority. The town of Kragerø lies within Kragerø Municipality and is therefore governed by the municipal council of Kragerø Municipality.

== See also ==
- List of towns and cities in Norway
