= List of archaeological sites and dismantled stave churches =

List of archaeological sites and dismantled stave churches in northern Europe. The list is still not complete, and will be continually revised as traces of churches are found all the time.

Iceland

- Þórarinsstaðir archaeological excavation in Seyðisfjörður, east Iceland (post church which predates stave church).

Norway

- Åkra Stave Church
- Ål Stave Church, Ål Municipality in Hallingdal, dismantled in 1880. Wood roof in the quire with paintings from the 13th century are now at display at Universitetets Oldsaksamling, Historisk Museum in Oslo.
- Årdal Stave Church. Parts of it on display at University Museum of Bergen.
- Atrå Stave Church
- Austad Stave Church (Bygland)
- Austad Stave Church (Lyngdal)
- Bagn Stave Church, Sør-Aurdal Municipality. Portal on display in Copenhagen. There are still two stave churches left in Sør-Aurdal Municipality: Reinli Stave Church and Hedalen Stave Church.
- Biri Stave Church
- Bjølstad Stave Church, portal reused in Bjølstad Chapel
- Bjørge Stave Church
- Bleken Stave Church
- Bødalen Stave Church
- Dal Stave Church
- Eggedal Stave Church
- Eri Stave Church
- Evje Stave Church
- Fåberg Stave Church
- Fen Stave Church
- Fjelberg Stave Church
- Flå Stave Church
- Fluberg Stave Church
- Gåra Stave Church
- Gaupne Stave Church, parts of which are incorporated into Old Gaupne Church
- Gausdal Stave Church
- Gransherad Stave Church
- Granvin Stave Church
- Grinaker Stave Church
- Grindheim Stave Church
- Hafslo Stave Church
- Hakastein Church, archaeological excavation of post church constructed between 1010 and 1040.
- Helgen Stave Church
- Hemsedal Stave Church
- Hjartdal Stave Church
- Hof Stave Church
- Holmedal Stave Church
- Holmen Stave Church (Sigdal)
- Horgen Stave Church
- Hylestad Stave Church, Setesdal. Demolished and the portal on display at Universitetets Oldsaksamling, Historisk Museum in Oslo.
- Imshaug Stave Church
- Jondal Stave Church
- Komnes Stave Church
- Kvam Stave Church in Nord-Fron Municipality
- Lårdal Stave Church
- Lesja Stave Church
- Lillehammer Stave Church
- Lisleherad Stave Church
- Lunder Stave Church
- Mæl Stave Church
- Melum Stave Church
- Mo Stave Church (Tokke)
- Nes Stave Church in Nes municipality
- Nesland Stave Church
- Odden Stave Church
- Olberg Stave Church
- Øyfjell Stave Church
- Øystese Stave Church
- Rinde Stave Church
- Sannidal Stave Church, parts preserved in Sannidal Church
- Sauda Stave Church
- Sauland Stave Church
- Skafså Stave Church
- Snarum Stave Church
- Solum Stave Church
- Stedje Stave Church. Parts of it on display at University Museum of Bergen.
- Svatsum Stave Church
- Tønjum Stave Church. Parts of it on display at University Museum of Bergen.
- Tuddal Stave Church
- Tuft Stave Church
- Ulvik Stave Church. Parts of it on display at University Museum of Bergen.
- Vågå Stave Church is sometimes referred to as a stave church, but is the result of extensive reconstruction with reuse of materials from the demolished stave church. Original stave church was constructed in 1150, and was converted to a cruciform church in 1626–28.
- Vangsnes Stave Church
- Varaldsøy Stave Church
- Veggli Stave Church
- Vegusdal Stave Church
- Veien Stave Church
- Veum Stave Church
- Vikøy Stave Church
- Vinje Stave Church, demolished around 1795 and replaced by Vinje Church, Telemark. Parts preserved in Universitetets Oldsaksamling, Oslo, and at the National Museum of Denmark, Copenhagen.

Sweden

- Clemens Church in Lund
- Drotten Church in Lund
- Hemse Stave Church, Gotland
- Maria Minor church in Lund built around 1060
- Vänga Stave Church near Borås, dendrochronologically dated to 1063–1065, parts reused in the first Vänga Church built in 1642.
