= Gåra Stave Church =

Medieval church in Norway, demolished 1850

Coordinates: 59.4231°N 9.1040°E

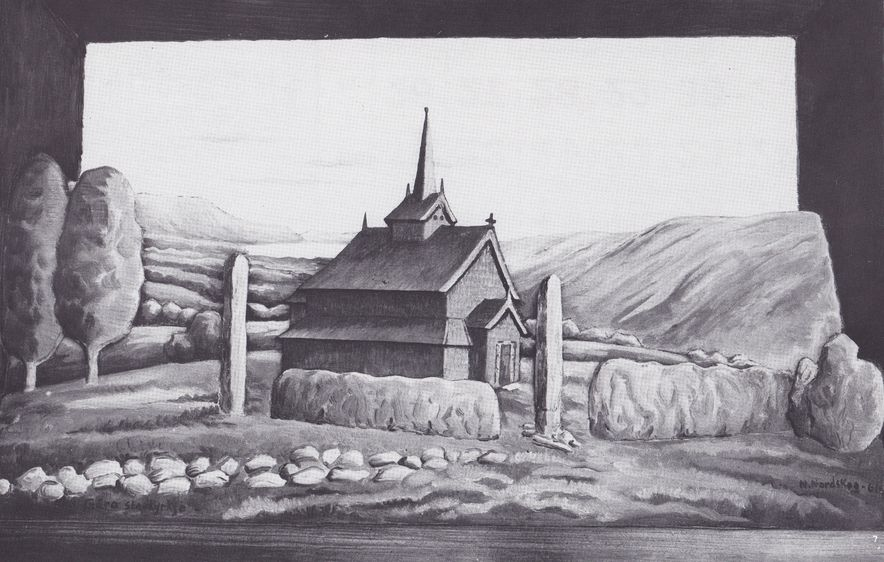
Carved wood relief of Gåra Stave Church made by Nordvald Nordskog in the 1960s. The stone slab and the standing stone on the right are those still standing today. Credit: Nordvald Nordskog

Gåra (Gaara) Stave Church (Nynorsk: Gåra stavkyrkje; Bokmål: Gåra stavkirke) was a smaller, single-nave (aisleless) stave church that stood on Gårahaugen (lit. 'The Gåra hill'), just outside the village of Bø in Midt-Telemark Municipality in Telemark county, Norway. The church was demolished in 1850. The church has sometimes been mistakenly called "Gvålakyrkja", but Gvåla is the old name for Valen, the neighboring farm to Gåra, and has therefore nothing to do with Gåra.

This stave church was a so-called "lovekirke", a private votive church, and is said to have been very old. Its Old Norse name was Gordina kirkja and it is first mentioned in Bishop Eystein's land register from 1398, but had to be much older than this. According to this book, the church was consecrated to the Virgin Mary on September 8, which was also the church's feast day, but its year and age are unknown. Gåra Church probably did not have its own priest, but the priest of Bø Church came a few times a year to hold services. Matins were also held on Christmas Eve until 1627.

In 2024, Telemark County Council and NIKU (Norwegian Institute for Cultural Heritage Research) published an interactive 3D model of Gåra Stave Church based on drawings by Andreas Faye (1824), where one can navigate around both inside and outside the church, with accompanying digital information boards.

== The Gåra Hill ==
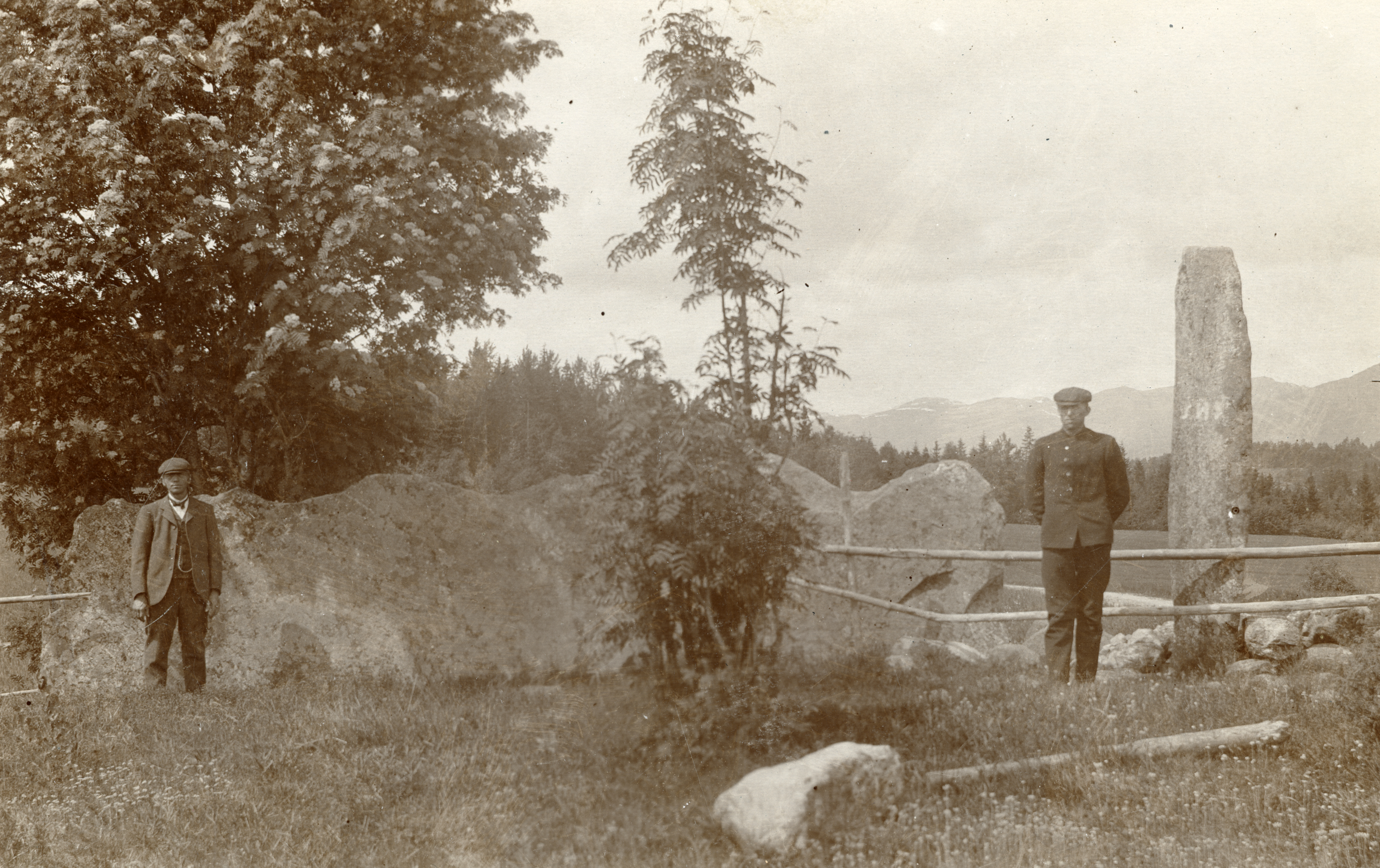
The stone slab and the standing stone on the Gåra Hill. Credit: Riksantikvaren

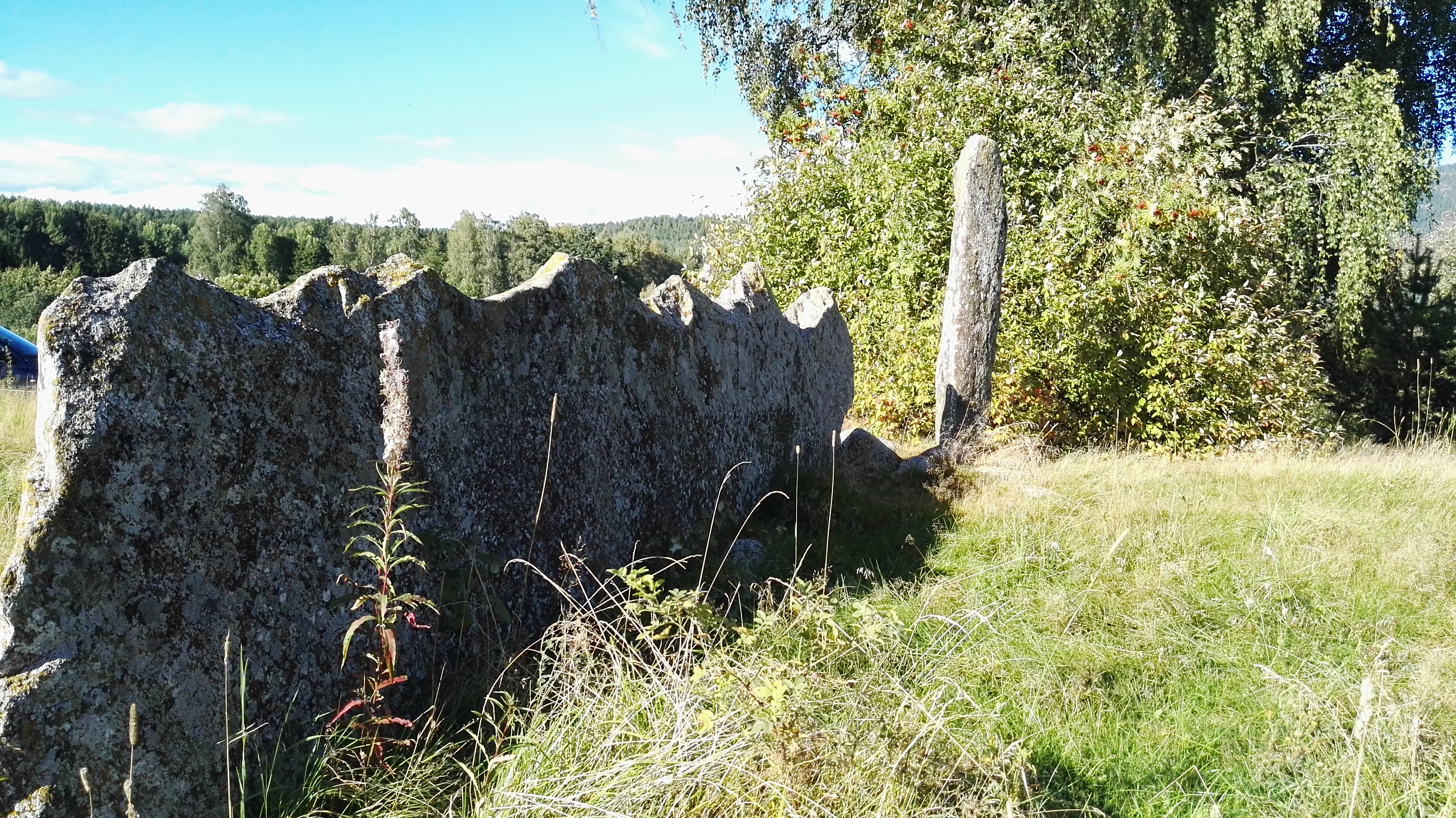
The stone slab and the standing stone.. Credit: Karl-Erik Mjaaland Steinsland

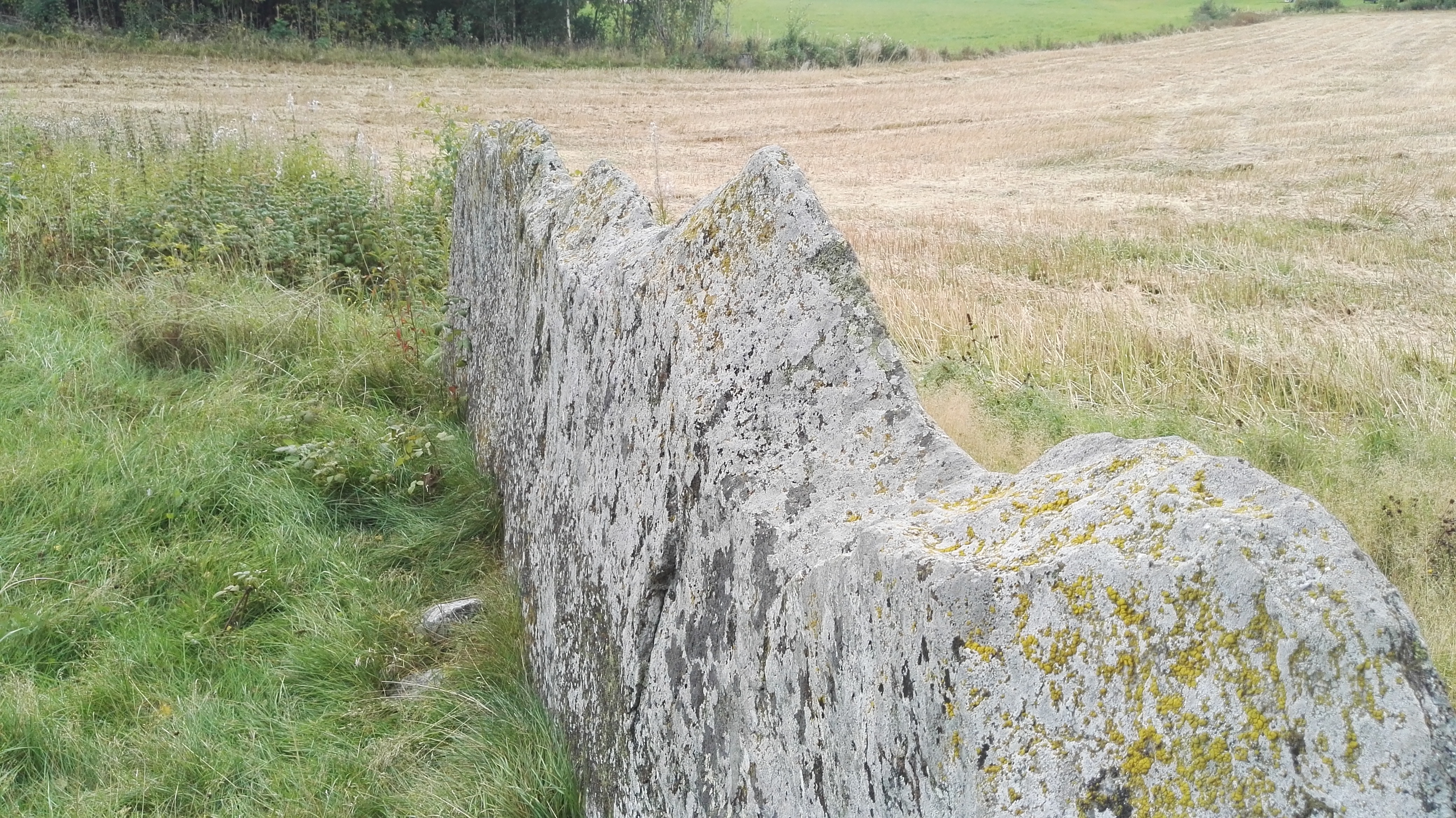
The stone slab and the standing stone.. Credit: Karl-Erik Mjaaland Steinsland

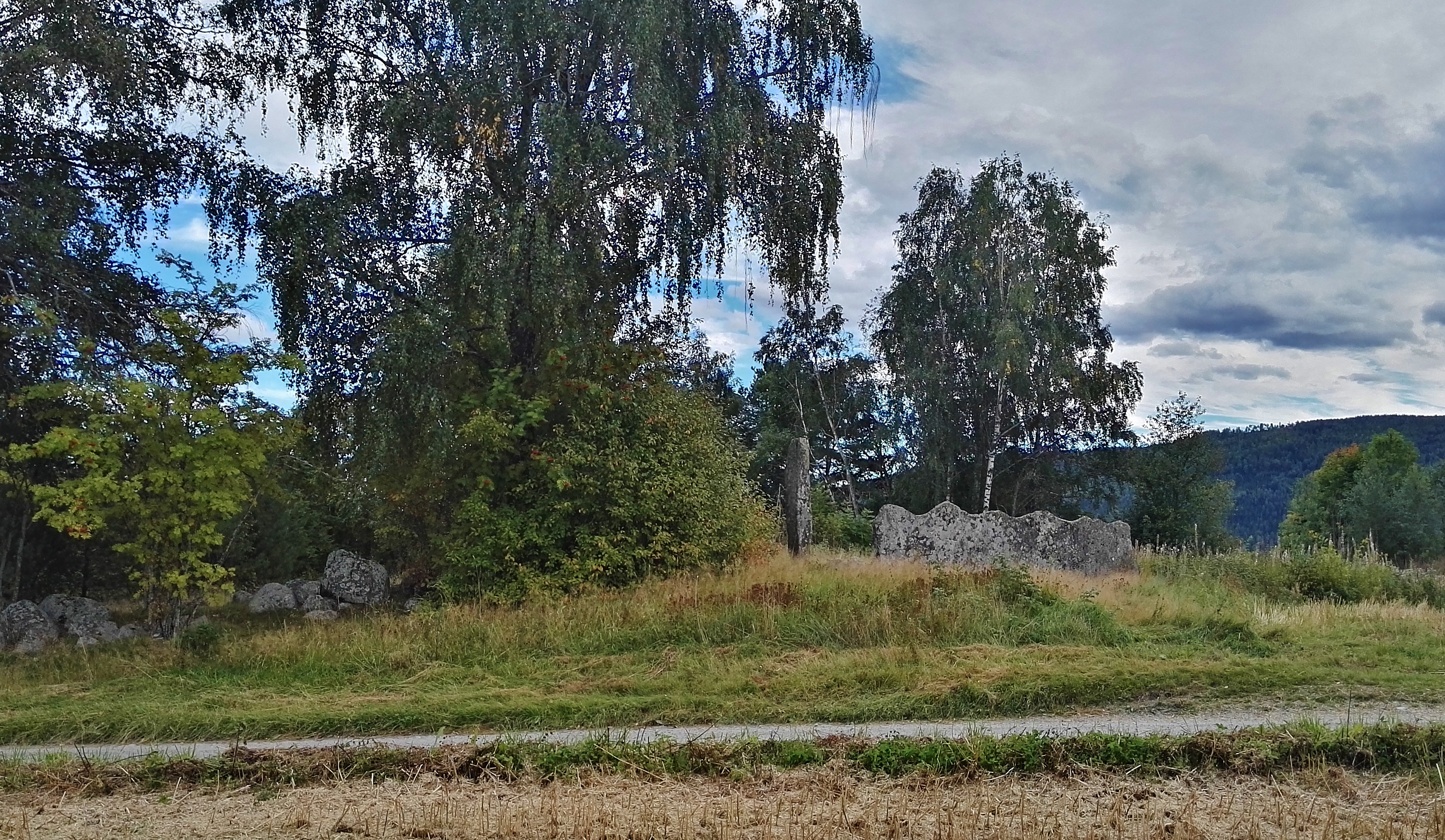
The top of the Gåra Hill, the standing stone, the stone slab and the old church lot and cemetery. Credit: Karl-Erik Mjaaland Steinsland

The church stood on Gårahaugen (The Gåra Hill), which belonged, and still belongs, to the Gåra farm. Gårahaugen has traditionally had a peculiar and scenic location with a good view towards Nes Church and Norsjø (Lake Norsjø). Gårahaugen is part of a large burial ground dating from the Iron Age, and there is said to have been a heathen temple (gudehov), or more probably just an important political and religious holysite, on the old church site in pre-Christian times.

What remains today on Gårahaugen is the so-called "Steinmerra" (Stone Mare) and "Gapestokken" (The Pillory), which are remnants of an octagonal stone formation made of standing stones and standing stone slabs. This megalithic structure is speculated to have been a heathen sacrificial grove, or at least an important religious and political holy-site from a pagan culture that was probably old and long outdated even in the Viking Age. Steinmerra is an upright stone slab measuring 6,5 meters (21,33 ft.) long and 1,7 meters (5,58 ft.) at its highest point above the ground. Along the top of Steinmerra, five large notches have been hewn out by human force, with these notches being sharpened. According to stories, this was used as a method of punishment, where the condemned sat astride it with heavy weights around their legs. This is not documented and is only speculation. It may also have been used as a sacrificial stone.

"Gapestokken" is a tall, triangular menhir/standing stone (bautastein). Today it measures 2,55 meters (8,366 ft.) above the ground, and the sides are between 40 and 50 centimeters (15,7”-19,7”) wide. This is just a menhir but has been mistakenly attributed the function of a pillory. Andreas Faye (1802–1869) published an article about this church, as well as an engraved print of the church, in Skilling-Magazin No. 75 in 1836. The original sketch from Faye's notebook is from 1824. In Faye's article in Skilling-Magazin, he mentions a second Steinmerr (stone mare/slab), with the still standing so-called Gapestokken standing in the middle of these slabs. This stone slab, which is not found on the church site today, is described by Faye as longer but lower than the one that remains, and is said to have been removed when the church was demolished. Faye also writes that the stone slabs must have been as much below the ground as above the ground.

Another menhir is also described, which is said to have stood on the opposite side of the missing Steinmerr. This menhir was apparently removed at the end of the 1700s (18th century) and was found again in the foundations of the smokehouse on the Austre Gaara (Eastern Gaara) farm when it was demolished in the 1960s.(Hvitsand, 1984, p. 147) Look what Gårahaugen is thought to have looked like in the 1700s (18th century) in the top image of the article. The menhir found in the foundation had a hole through one end. Legend has it that there were several of these menhirs and stone slabs which formed an octagonal stone formation around the old heathen temple or holysite. The Old Norse name of the Gåra farm is Gordinj, and according to Jon Hvitsand, this may mean "The holy enclosed site," which refers to this stone formation. It is possible that some of this stone formation was removed to make space for the stave church. There are stories of a total of 6 such stone slabs, and together with the menhirs, these are said to have formed a stone formation of 12 stones, which may also indicate that it could have been an old Thing site (assembly place), a place for political purposes and a holy religious place. (Lunde, 1972, p. 62)

The book "Kirker i Telemark" (Churches in Telemark) mentions an old legend that tells how Gåra Stave Church was originally built as a heathen temple, and that Saint Olaf consecrated the building as a Christian church when he was on a mission to Christianize Telemark. This legend is also mentioned by historian Gregar O. Nordbø. Whether there is any truth to such legends can of course be discussed, but the church building is said to have been very old. The church building is thus said to have been the oldest in Grenland, which in the High Middle Ages was the area that today comprises Drangedal Municipality, Midt-Telemark Municipality, and Notodden Municipality. Gåra stave church had straight endings on both the chancel, doors, and windows, which was common for the oldest churches in Norway. Like Gåra Stave Church, many of the oldest Norwegian churches were also dedicated to the Virgin Mary. (Hvitsand, 1984, p. 148) However, Gåra Church was a stave church, and not a post church (stolpekirke) like the very first churches in Norway often were.

Another legend recounts: Tradition has it that long ago, a church first built as a heathen temple, stood at "Djupegrop" (between Valen and Vinbekk in Bø, Telemark) and that it was later moved to Gårahaugen (The Gåra Hill) by invisible forces during nighttime. Supposedly there was found a key at Djupegrop that fit in the door lock in one of the doors at Gåra stave church. During a fire at Djupegrop, which spread through the forest, a stone setting resembling a foundation was revealed, and its size is the same as that of the church at Gårahaugen.

== Gåra stave church ==
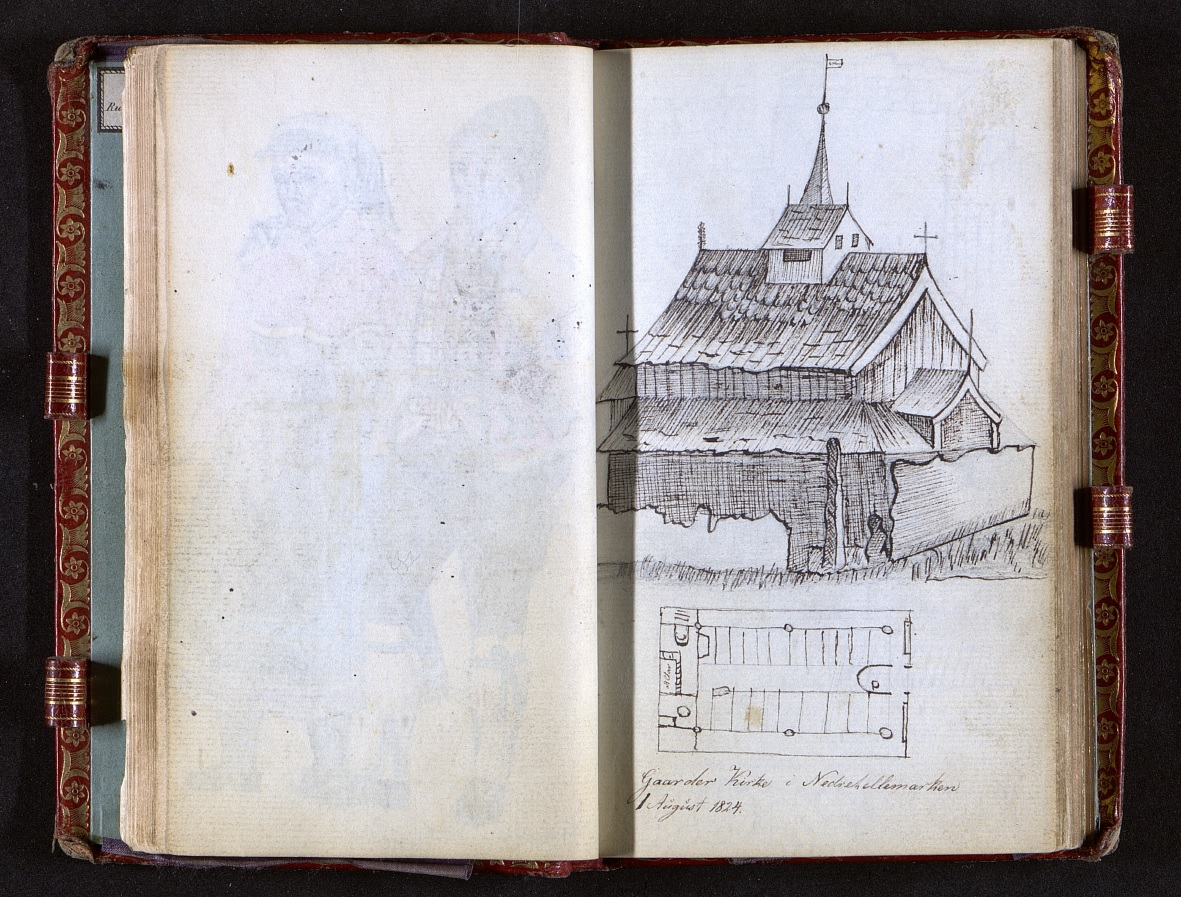
Andreas Faye's sketch of "Gaarder Church in Lower Telemarken, August 1st, 1824" from his travel journal En Mindekrands fra svundne Dage (A Memorial Wreath from Days Gone By). Private collection. Photo: Kuben, Arendal.

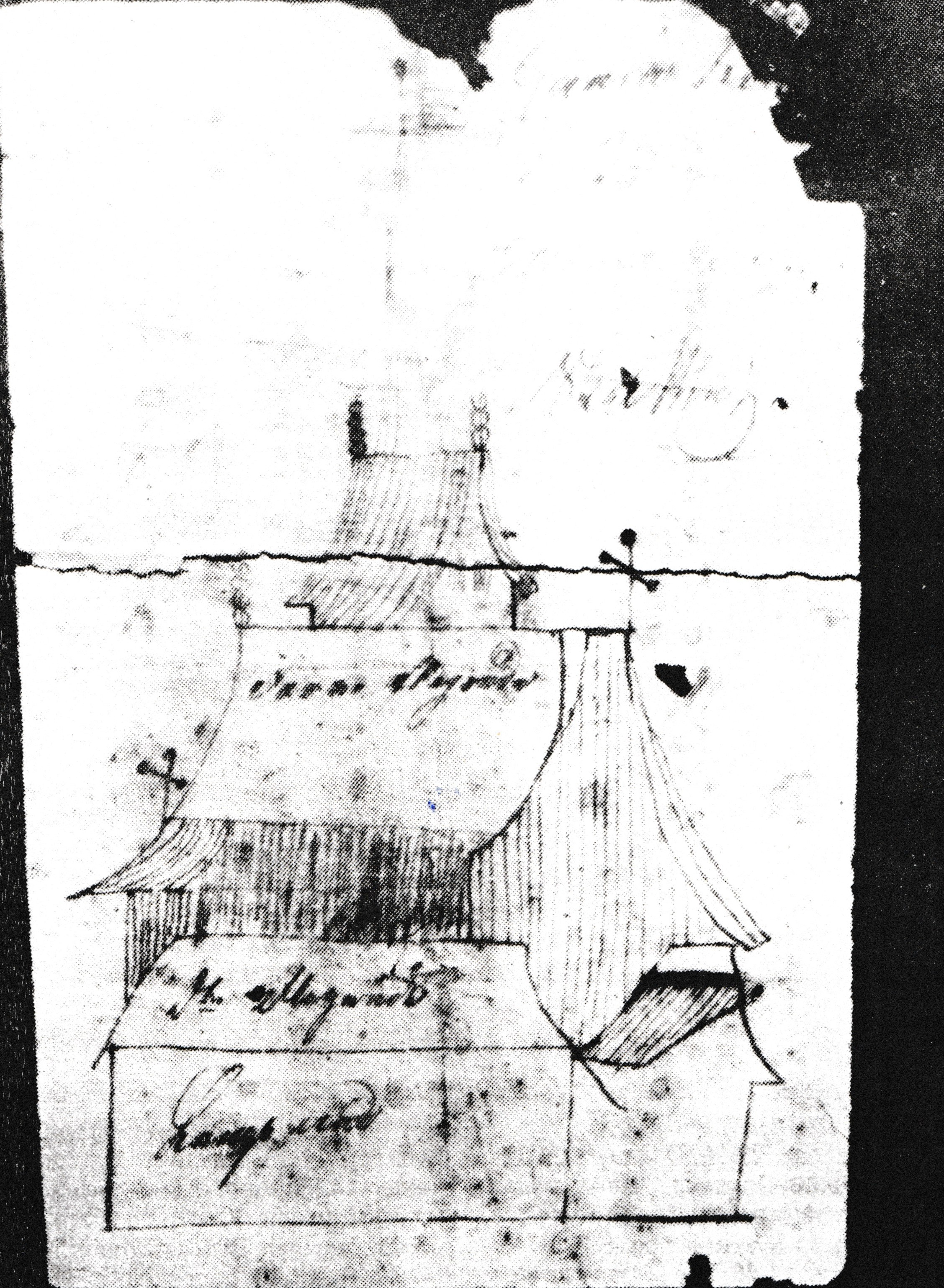
Drawing found in a closet in Snertingdal

Gåra Church was a small and simple stave church built of massive pinewood. The church was erected with six massive staves, four of which formed the corners of the church.(Nordbø, 1925, p. 12) The staves were set with solid sill beams above and below. The walls between the staves were built of massive wooden planks over an ell wide (approx. 62,7 cm or 24,7 inches). (Lunde, 1972, p. 62) On the outside, the church was clad with tarred and caulked wooden shingles on the walls and roof. In the 1720s, however, the wooden shingle roof was replaced with red clay roof tiles. (Nordbø, 1925, p. 17)

The church had 3 entrance doors: one at the western end as the main entrance, one on the south wall of the nave, and one in the chancel on the south side. Outside the chancel door, there was a small staircase, as this door was somewhat higher up on the wall due to the raised floor in the chancel. (Nordbø, 1925, p. 18) The church also had 3 windows: two in the nave and one in the chancel, all on the sunny south side. The church had exterior galleries/passages (svalganger) that ran around the church on 3 sides. There was no outer gallery/passage around the chancel. One entered the outer galleries/passages through 3 "skruv" (entrances): one at the main entrance and one below each of the windows on the south wall of the nave. The "skruv" were "røstet utad" (projected outwards) (Nordbø, 1925, p. 17). The chancel was lower and may have been slightly narrower than the nave. On the middle of the church roof, a small bell tower with a spire was built. (Nordbø, 1925, p. 19) Here hung two bells that are said to have been from the 1100s (12th century)(Nordbø, 1925, p. 8). The church also had a portal around the main entrance, consisting of two carved planks. The portal is now located in the University Museum of Cultural History in Oslo. (Lunde, 1972, p. 63)

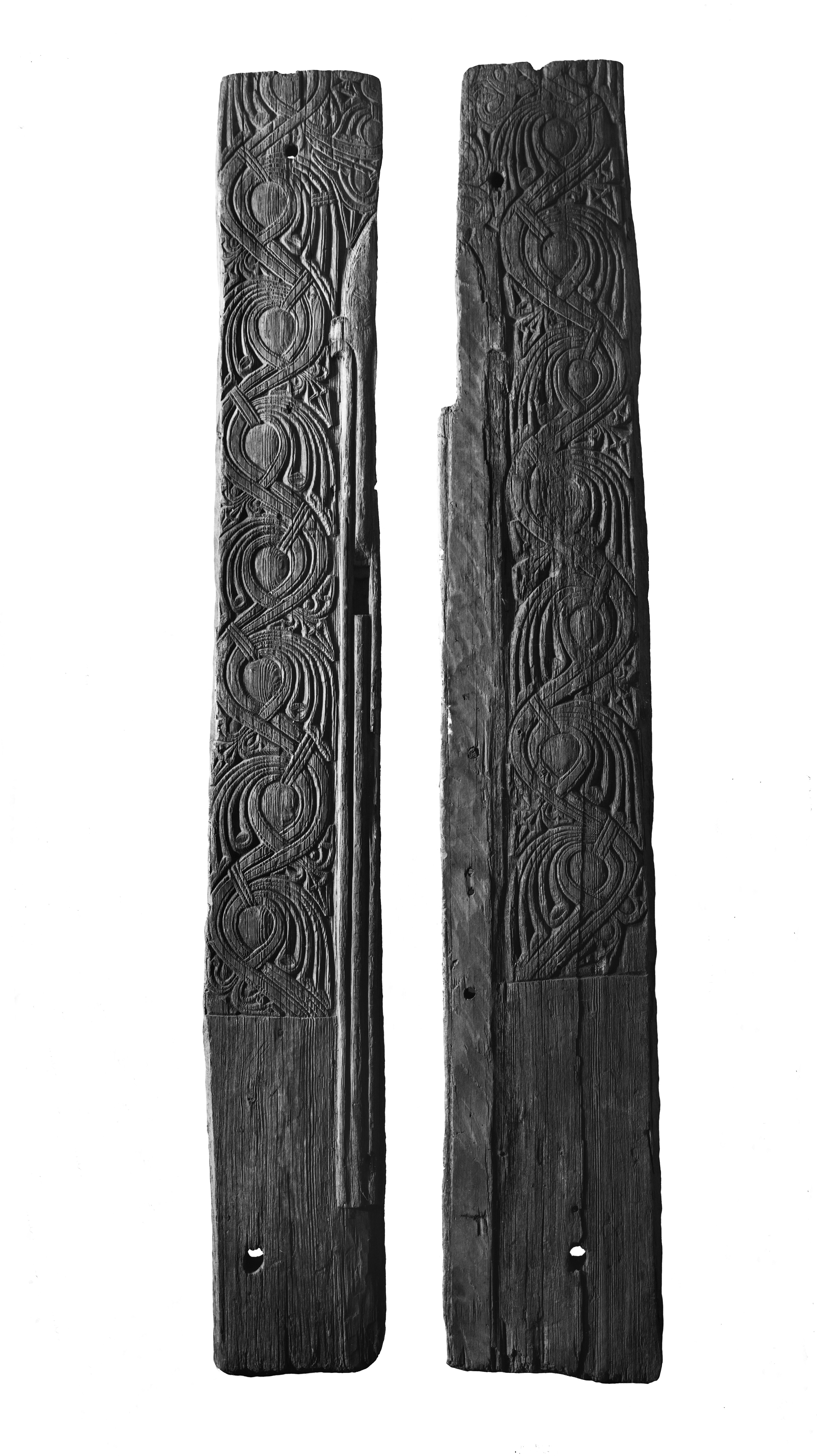
The main entrance portal planks from Gåra stave church

=== The church bells ===
Little is known about the church bells, which were said to have been made in the 1100s (12th century)(Nordbø, 1925, p. 8). One of the two lost bells is said to have had an inscription that was written down in 1805, but the content is unknown. (Nordbø, 1925, p. 19) In addition, one of the bells is said to have been used as a work bell at Holden Ironworks (later Ulefos Ironworks), but after an inquiry in 1916, the bell had not been there for a long time, and only one of the oldest workers at the plant could remember this bell. (Nordbø, 1925, p. 20)

=== Interior ===
Inside, the church had the usual pews (church benches) on each side of the aisle, probably installed during the Reformation. There was a simple pulpit by the window in the chancel and a wooden baptismal font with a lid. A small cupboard also hung in the chancel. The baptismal font, estimated to be from the 1400s (15th century), is now at the Norwegian Museum of Cultural History. The knave had a flat ceiling (Nordbø, 1925, p. 18), while the chancel ceiling was vaulted(Nordbø, 1925, p. 13; 18). In both the roof and walls, in the knave and chancel, there are mentions of full body sized paintings of biblical stories, which may also have been from the 1400s (15th century). The paintings are said to have been painted in broad strokes, and Jesus' enemies are said to have had more or less inhuman features.(Nordbø, 1925, p. 13) A drawn copy of some of these paintings is reproduced in the book of Cultural History of Bø in Telemark. There were no interior galleries, the church did not get an altar until 1655, and no altarpiece was ever documented. Holy Communion was also never held in Gåra Stave Church.(Nordbø, 1925, p. 13; 18)

==== Runic inscription ====
Officer, civil servant, and numismatist Claudius Schive (Claus Johan Schive) once analyzed a copy of a rune inscription that came from Gåra Stave Church. The copy was transcribed in 1839, and the rune inscription is said to have been in the exterior gallery passage to the left of the main entrance of the church. The runes were carved from right to left, and directly translated, the runes said "kora neris sun reist mik." In standard Old Norse: "Kári Neriðsson reist mik." In modern language, this becomes "Kåre Neridsson carved me". According to Sophus Bugge, one dares to identify Kåre Neridsson as "Kor Næiris son" mentioned in DN IV No. 366, p. 294 from 1354. If this is correct, the runes can be dated to around 1350, but Sophus Bugge emphasizes that the R-rune in the inscription fits better with a somewhat older dating, but there is apparently no basis for assuming that an older relative carved the runes. To the left of the runes in the inscription, some kind of sign was carved. According to Magnus Olsen, this sign is probably a stylization of joined Latin letters that forms a man's name. With this assumption, we find the name "CORE" in the sign, which corresponds to the runes that reproduce the carver's name. (Olsen, 1951, p. 186-190).N_146: Runeinnskrift fra Gåra kirke i Telemark

=== Size ===
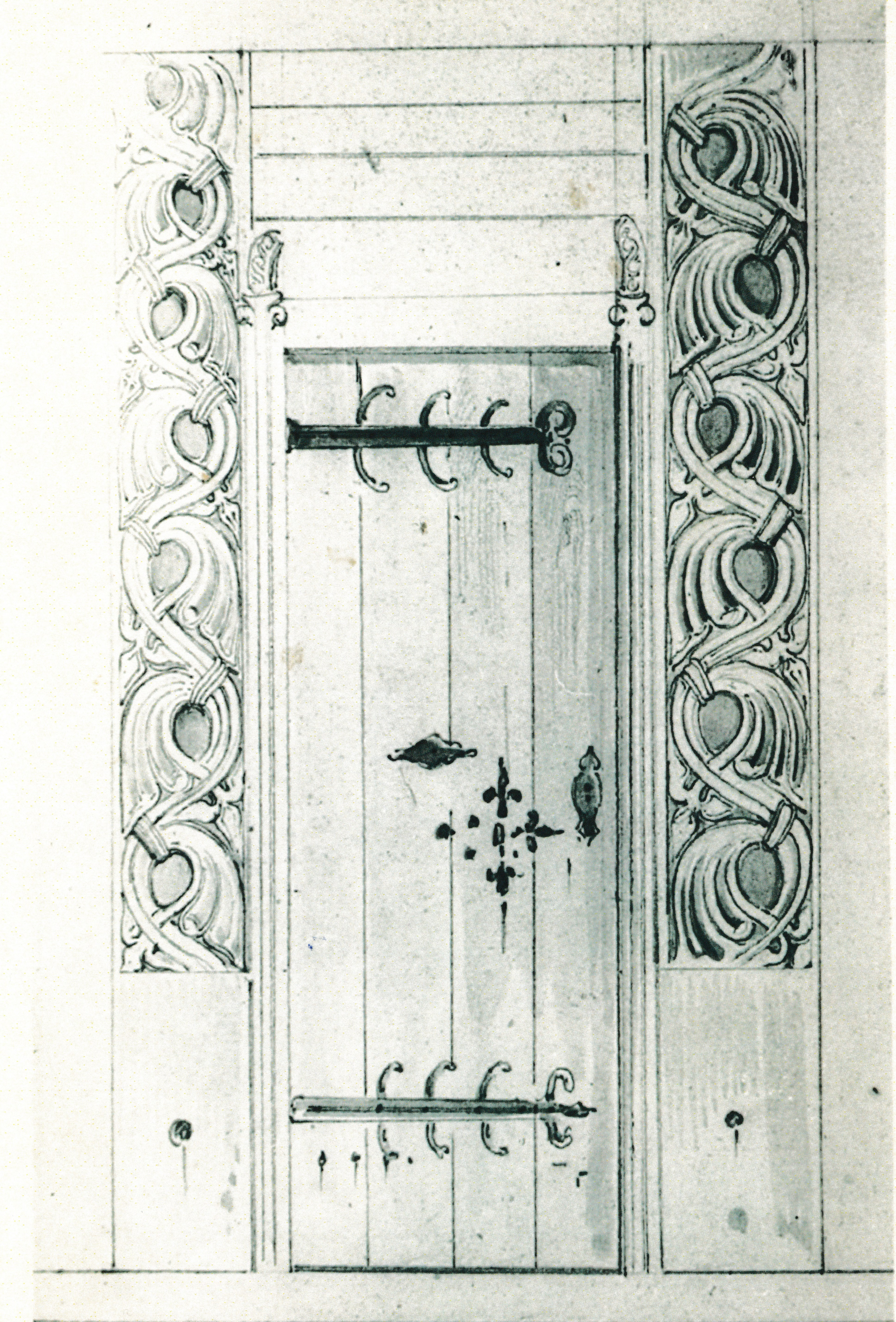
Main entrance door and portal of Gåra stave church. Sketch by F. W. Schiertz

No measurement of the church's size was ever taken while it still stood. On November 10, 1924, an investigation of the church site was carried out by Gregar O. Nordbø, under the supervision of engineer Halvor Johs. Gaara. The estimated size of the church was then set as follows: the church building itself, the nave, 16 feet wide and 28 feet long (approx. 5 x 8,8 m). The exterior galleries were 4 feet wide (approx. 1,25 m), and the church's total width was 24 feet (approx. 7,5 m). (Nordbø, 1925, p. 18) These measurements are by the feet standard that was used in Norway in 1924. The chancel of the stave church was probably in addition to the above dimensions, and the chancel's dimensions are therefore unknown. (Nordbø, 1925, p. 18)

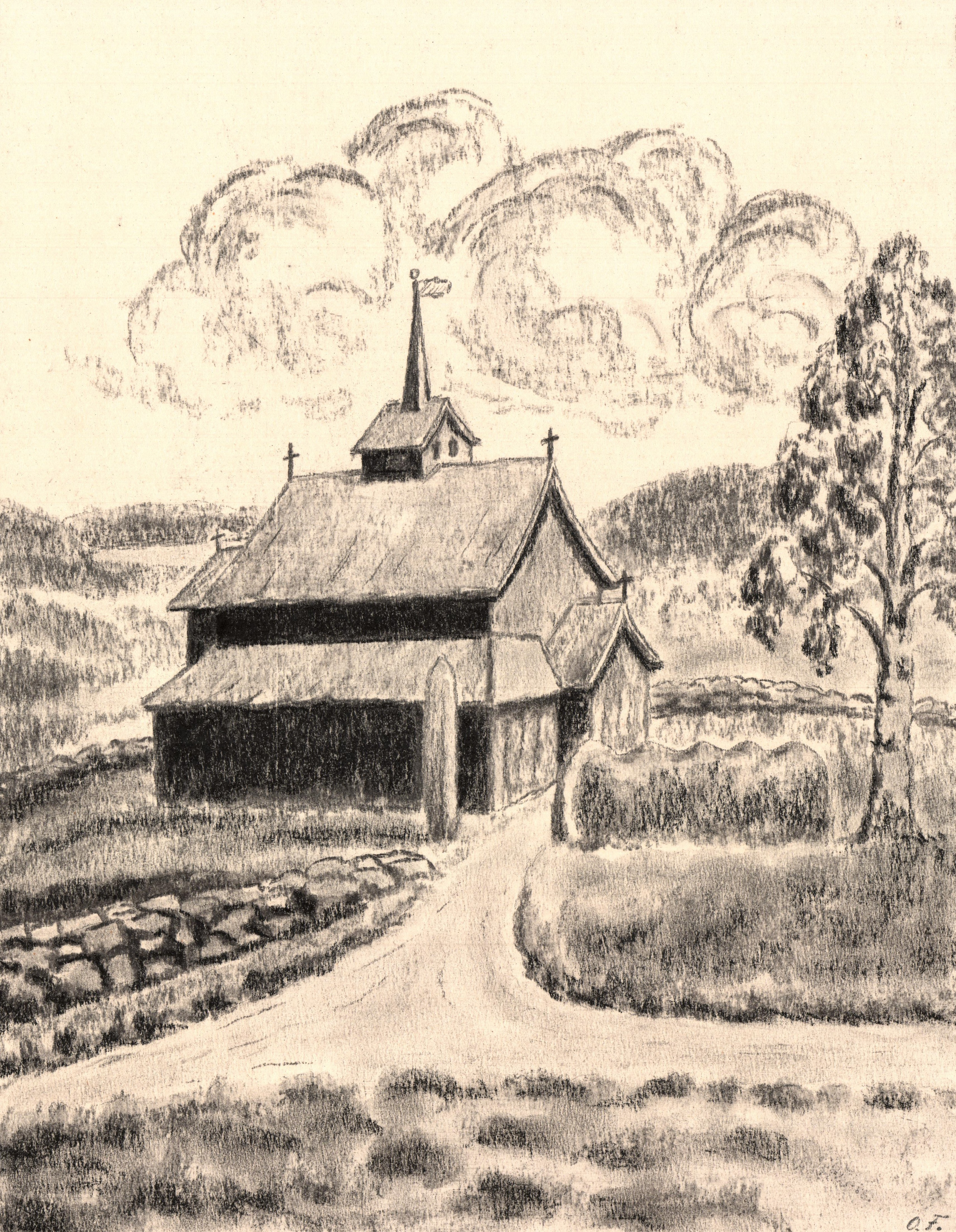
Sketch of Gåra stave church, by Olav K. Folkestad. (Public domain)

=== Ecclesiastical acts ===
Gåra Stave Church was a "lovekirke", a private votive church, likely never had its own priest, and all tithes went to the main church in Bø, Telemark. However, Gåra Church had church property and its own land. In 1663, 4 services were held annually. 10 years later, 3 services were held annually, and these were scheduled for the 3 "Vor Frue-dager" (Our Lady Days). By 1784, this was further reduced to 1 service a year, held on St. John's Day or the Sunday after. In the last years the church was used, the religious gatherings were occasional and irregular. (Nordbø, 1925, p. 11-12) The last Mass in Gåra Stave Church was held on August 28, 1814, and the last recorded ecclesiastical act was a burial on October 29 of the same year. The very last burial at Gåra Church was of an old and blind woman. At that time, there were no church bells, and the body was not entombed. (Nordbø, 1925, p.46) Gåra Stave Church was the regular church for the workers at Hørteverket (Hørte Ironworks) who lived on the Bø side of the Hørte river. (Nordbø, 1925, p. 39)

During a provost's visitation in 1835, there was talk of obligating the church owner to repair the church so that it could be used again, but this amounted to nothing more than correspondence between the ecclesiastical authorities. In 1837, the church was recommended for demolition by the deanery. (Nordbø, 1925, p. 35) In a letter to Bø municipality council on February 22, 1839, we learn that the owner of the church, under strong pressure, had brought materials for the repair of the church (Nordbø, 1925, p. 36), but on March 15 of the same year, it was decided that the church should not be repaired. (Nordbø, 1925, p. 37) On June 18, 1840, the church was declared closed by royal decree (Nordbø, 1925, p. 40), and for the last 10 years, the church was used as a summer shed for livestock and drying room for potato vines and leaf fodder. (Nordbø, 1925, p. 41) When the church was demolished in 1850, 63 Norwegian silver coins from 1280 to 1387 were found under the floor, but the church must have been much older than this.(Lunde, 1972, p. 62)

=== The Gåra chair ===
The most famous artifact from Gåra Stave Church is Gårastolen (the Gåra Chair). It is a richly carved wooden chair whose magnificent details stand in strong contrast to the church's otherwise relatively simple details and carvings. It is not known how this chair ended up in Gåra Church or how old it is. The legend has it that this is actually King Sverre's throne, the whereabouts of which are also unknown. How the chair is supposed to have traveled from Sverresborg (King Sverre's castle in Trondheim) down to Gåra Stave Church is not mentioned in the legend. This could be a myth and should naturally be taken with a grain of salt. The Gåra Chair probably came to Gåra Church before the Reformation in 1536. Professor Dahl wrote in 1837 that he considered the chair to have been used as a high seat or a lord's seat. Morgenbladet (a Norwegian newspaper) wrote in 1881 that the chair is most likely from the 1300s (14th century). In Bergen Museum's manuscript collection No. 255,1, Professor Dahl estimates that the Gåra Chair is actually from around the turn of the 1100s (12th century). At the front of the chair, there is an integrated footrest, and if what is written in the sagas about King Sverre being a small man is true, it strengthens the theory that King Sverre's throne ended up in Gåra Stave Church.(Nordbø, 1925, p. 20-26) (Hvitsand, 1984, p 151-152) The chair is now located in the Museum of Cultural History in Oslo. Gårastolen

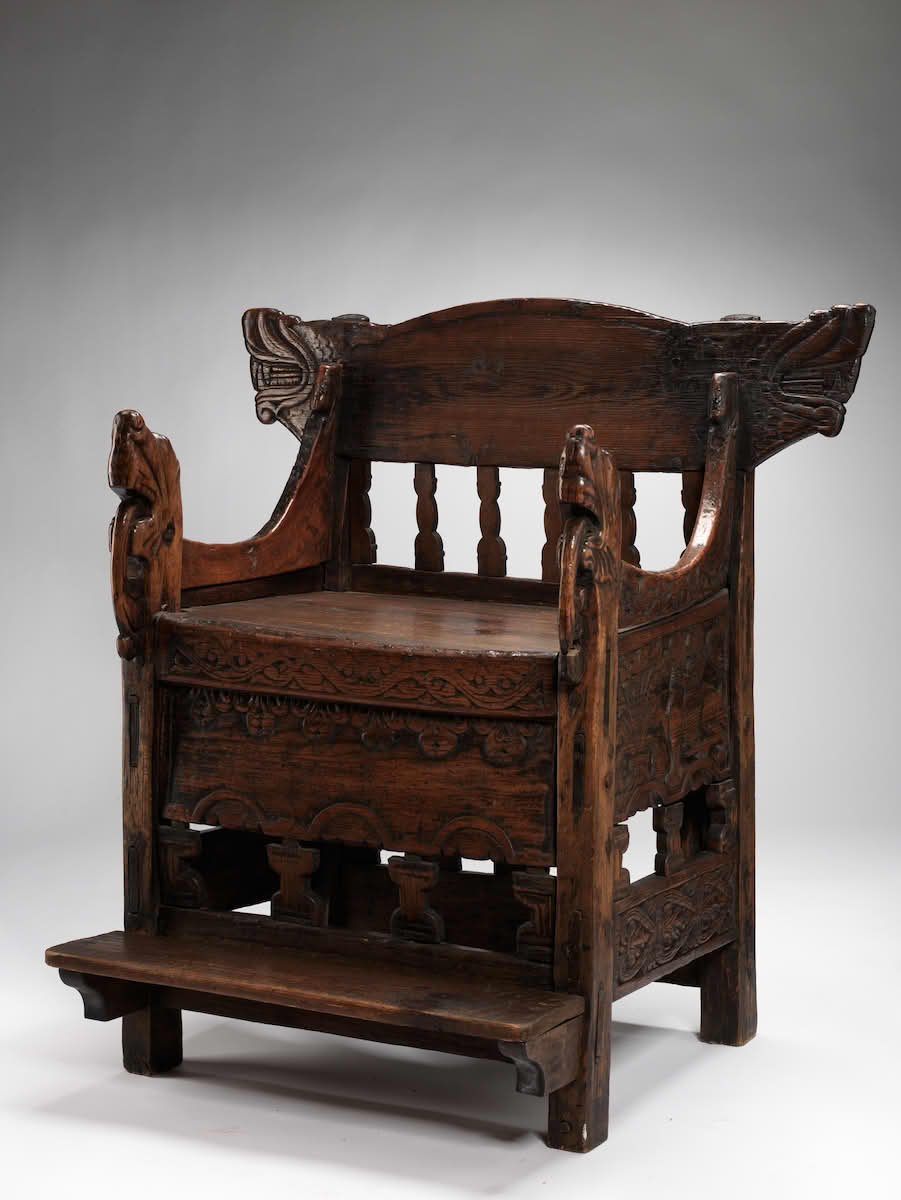
The Gåra chair. National Museum of Norway / Harvik, Andreas

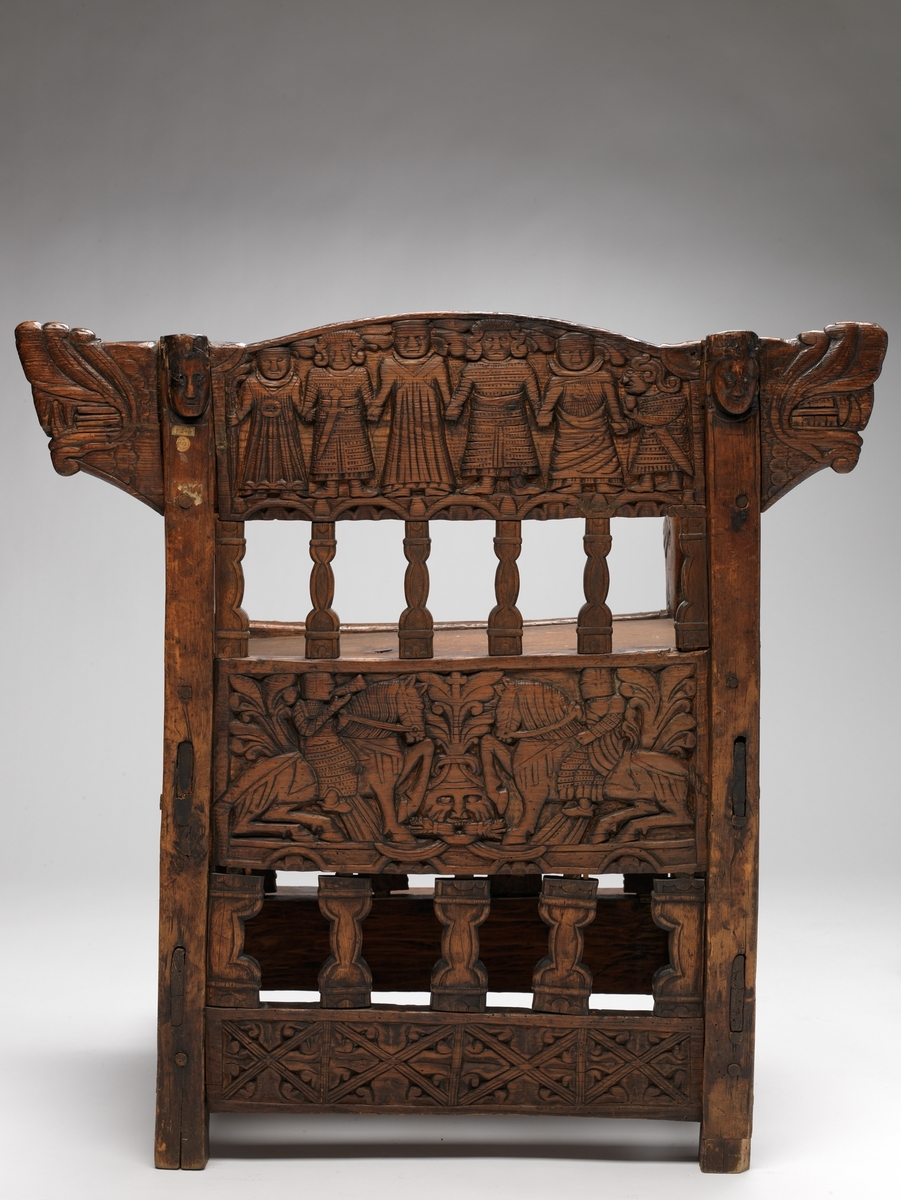
The Gåra chair, backside. National Museum of Norway / Harvik, Andreas

=== References ===
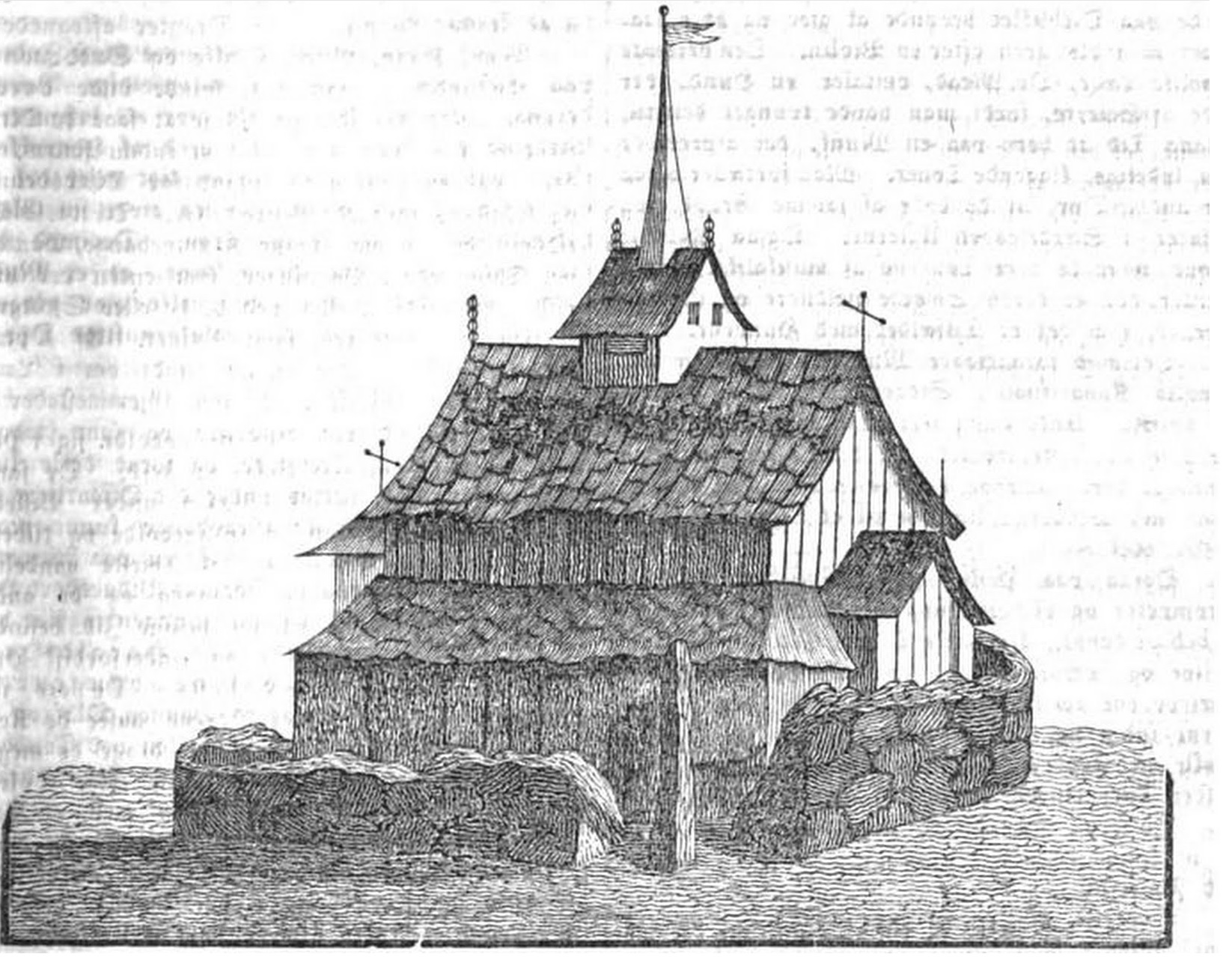
Engraved print of Gåra stave church, based on the original 1924 sketch by Faye, Skilling Magazin nr. 75, 1836

=== Sources and links ===
- Nordbø, Gregar Olsson. Gaara kirke, 1926.
- Lunde, Gunnar. Bø-soga 1, kultursoga, 1972.
- Hvitsand, Jon. Soga om Hørteverket, 1984.
- Olsen, Magnus. Norges innskrifter med de yngre runer, 1951.
- Red. Henriksveen, Herman. Kirker i Telemark, 1986.
- Bø Soga II, Gards- og ættesoga, Band IV
- Gåra kyrkjestad, Kulturminnesøk.
- Gåra stavkirke, Norske kirker
- Gåra gravfelt. Kulturminnesøk.
- Bare steinmerra og gapestokken står igjen
- Faye, J.C. Dahl og tidlige tanker om bygnings- og fortidsminnevern i Norge
- Article which writes about and reproduced Andreas Faye's article in Skilling-Magazin No. 75 in 1836
- The runic inscription from Gåra stave church. (alvin-portal.org)
- 3D Model of Gåra stave church (Vestfold og Telemark fylke og NIKU)
- Nordbø, Gregar (1925). Gaara Kirke [Gaara Church] (in Norwegian). Skien, Norway: Historielaget for Telemark og Grenland. pp. 6, 7, 8, 9, 11, 12, 13, 14, 17, 18, 19, 20, 36, 37, 39, 40, 41, 46, 48.
