= Øyjar Chapel =

Church in Innlandet, Norway

- Øyjar kapell
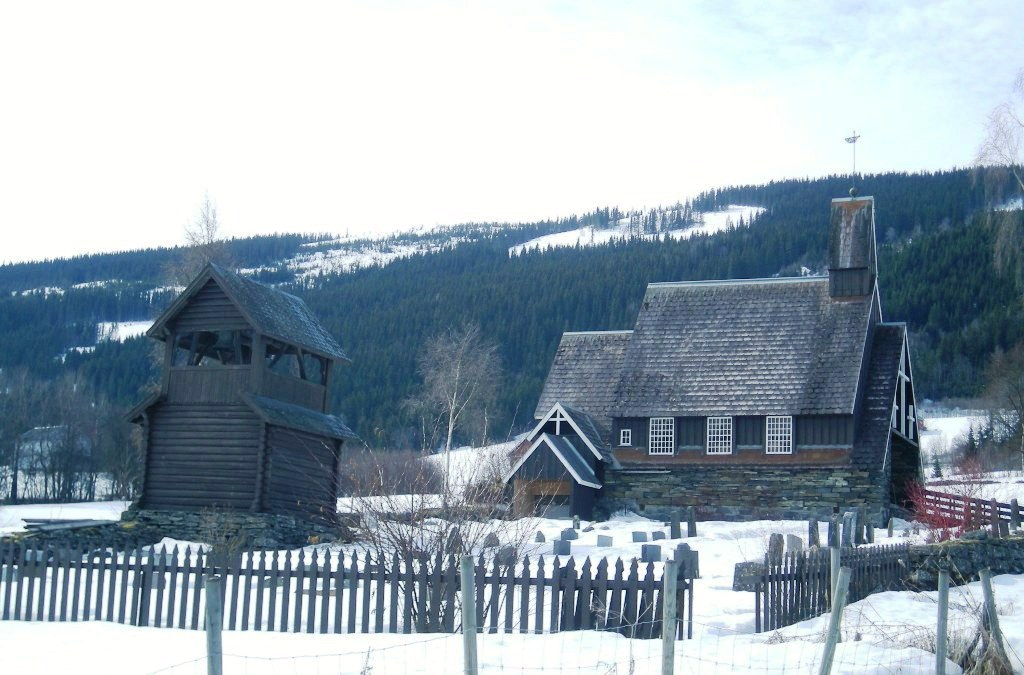
- View of the church Credit: Jan-Tore Egge
- Øyjar Chapel
- 61°02′36″N 9°00′51″E
- Location: Vestre Slidre, Innlandet
- Country: Norway
- Denomination: Church of Norway
- Previous denomination: Catholic Church
- Churchmanship: Evangelical Lutheran

History
- Status: Parish church
- Founded: 11th century
- Consecrated: 12 April 1964

Architecture
- Functional status: Active
- Architect: Karl Stenersen
- Architectural type: Long church
- Completed: 1964 (62 years ago)
- Closed: 1747-1964

Specifications
- Capacity: 80
- Materials: Wood

Administration
- Diocese: Hamar bispedømme
- Deanery: Valdres prosti
- Parish: Røn
- Norwegian Cultural Heritage Site
- Type: Church
- Status: Not protected
- ID: 85942

Øyjar Chapel (Norwegian: Øyjar kapell) is a parish church of the Church of Norway in Vestre Slidre Municipality in Innlandet county, Norway. It is located in the village of Øyjar. It is one of the churches for the Røn parish which is part of the Valdres prosti (deanery) in the Diocese of Hamar. The brown, wooden church was built in a long church design in 1964 using plans drawn up by the architect Karl Stenersen. The church seats about 80 people.

== History ==
The earliest existing historical records of the church date back to the year 1316, but the church was not new that year. The first church at Øyjar was likely a wooden post church that was built in the 1000s (11th century). This church was located immediately north of the present-day Øyjar Chapel. It likely burned down during the late-13th century. Right after this, a new wooden stave church was built on the same site. The old church had a long church design with a tower on the roof of the nave and open-air corridors surrounding the building. Historically, the spelling of the church name has varied, including Øyjar, Øyar, Øye, and others. During the 1600s, the church was repaired due to rot. In the 1740s, the parish decided to close and merge two churches (Øyjar Church and Fystro Church), which were located on either side of the Slidrefjorden, and to replace them with one church that would be newly built at the village of Røn. The new Røn Church was built in 1747 and the other two churches were torn down afterwards.

After the demolition of the old Øyjar Church, the cemetery that surrounded the church continued to be used for centuries. In 1956, a planning committee was established to plan a new church on the old site. In 1962, permission was given to build a new chapel at the old church site. The chapel was designed by Karl Stenersen and the lead builder was Lars Wiknes. It is a long church with a rectangular nave and narrower, rectangular chancel. There is a sacristy on either side of the chancel. The chapel was consecrated on 12 April 1964. The chapel is not actually considered a chapel, but it has the status of a parish church - one of two churches in the Røn parish, so it is sometimes called Øyjar Church as well.

In 1965, the old church site, just north of the new chapel was investigated by the historian Luce Hinsch. Traces of the old foundation were unearthed, but they were so badly damaged by more recent burials that the size of the church could not be determined. About 20 coins from the Middle Ages were found on the old church site. About half of the coins were dated to about 1250–1350. Underneath the foundation that was discovered, there was evidence of a fire of a previous structure. Radiological dating shows that the preceding structure was from the 1000s. This supports the theory that the first church burned sometime around the year 1300 and a new church was built.

== See also ==
- List of churches in Hamar
