= Hakastein Church =

Former church in Norway

Coordinates: 59°11′44″N 9°35′36″E

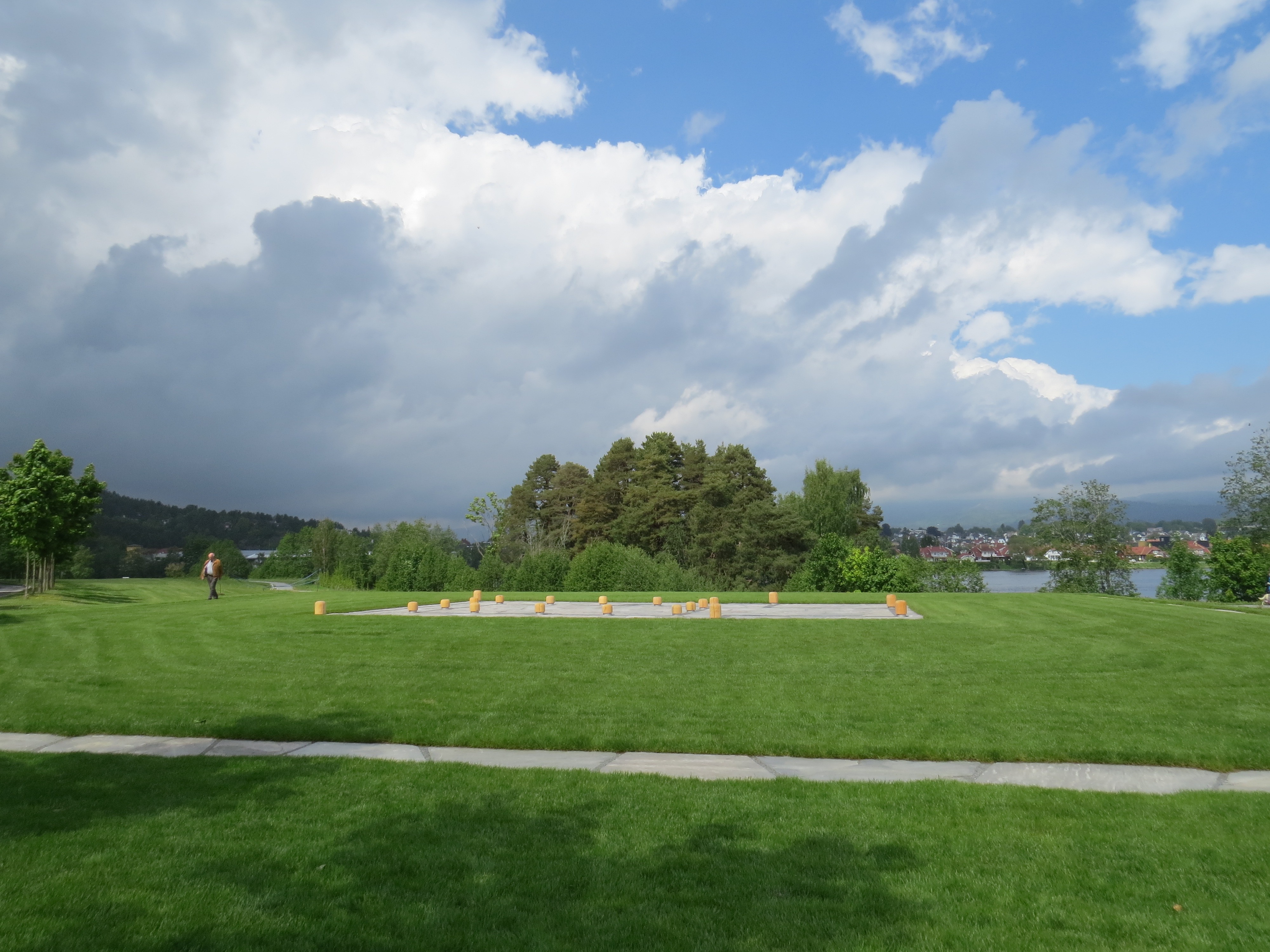

Hakastein Church was a church under Gimsøy Abbey near Skien in Norway. It is first referred to in a manuscript from 1354.

In 2001, archaeologists uncovered post-holes and other features which are believed to belong to the church. Radiocarbon dating of material from the post-holes suggest that the church was constructed between 1010 and 1040, making it one of Norway's earliest post churches. Earlier features on the site, such as graves, were dated to the mid 10th century.

== Other sources ==
- Sigurðsson, Jon Viðar (2003) Kristninga i Norden 750–1200 ISBN 978-82-521-5940-0
- Gardåsen, Tor Kjetil; Thor Gundersen, Magne Kortner and Ragnar Olsen (2000) Summa Summarum – Skien i 1000 år (Skien: Forlaget Grenland) ISBN 82-91986-28-2
