= Hedared Stave Church =

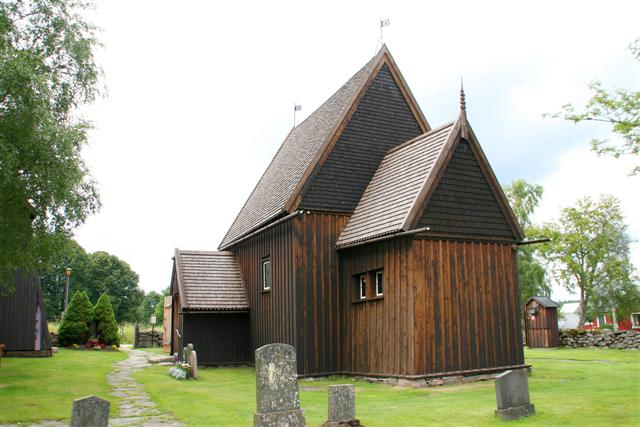

- Location of the church Hedared Stave Church (Sweden)
- 57°48′32″N 12°44′47″E
- Location: Hedared, Västra Götaland
- Country: Sweden
- Denomination: Church of Sweden

Architecture
- Architectural type: Stave church

Specifications
- Materials: Wood

Administration
- Diocese: Skara

Hedared Stave Church is a stave church situated in Hedared between Alingsås and Borås in Västra Götaland county, in the west of Sweden. It belongs to the Diocese of Skara.

== Description ==
It is Sweden's only preserved medieval stave church. For a long time it was assumed Hedared stave church dated to early medieval times because it was built as a stave church. Already at the beginning of the 20th century, the archaeologist and architectural historian Emil Ekhoff argued that the church was considerably later than the Hemse Stave Church on Gotland, fragments of which he had found under the floor of the current Romanesque stone church during an 1896 excavation, and other stave churches that he had recorded either archaeologically or through written sources. Ekhoff posited a late-medieval, 14th or 15th century, date, with a preference for the former. He based this on some of the carpentry techniques used in the church. Dendrochronological methods have later confirmed Ekhoff's suspicion of a late dating and have been able to narrow it down to the very end of the medieval period. The logs date to some time around 1498–1503, with 1501 as the most likely year for the felling of the trees and a building year in the following years, to allow for the drying of the wood. A 1506 letter from the bishop mentioning the construction of a church in the parish is likely to refer to this building.

The interior is tiny (35 square meters) and very plain, and when originally built, the church had only walls and a roof, earth floor and no windows. It has been modified and added to a couple of times, gaining wooden floor in 1735 and the present windows in 1781. Before that it only had a small light hole (lysglugg). In 1901 its exterior was restored to be as original as possible, but the windows were kept. In 1934–35 the interior was restored, and when removing the inner walls an altar painting was discovered. It was painted directly on the wall. A more advanced restoration took place in the 1990s. The church was raised some 70 centimetres, and the old wooden ground was replaced.

There is an old altar (kalk) in the church, dating from the 13th century, wooden sculptures of Virgin Mary and Saint Francis and beautiful old paintings. Those are done by Johan Ehrenfrid, although the altar painting is older and assumed to have been made some time during the medieval times. As the church is dated very late in the medieval times this could indicate that the painting was done when the church was built.

== Gallery ==
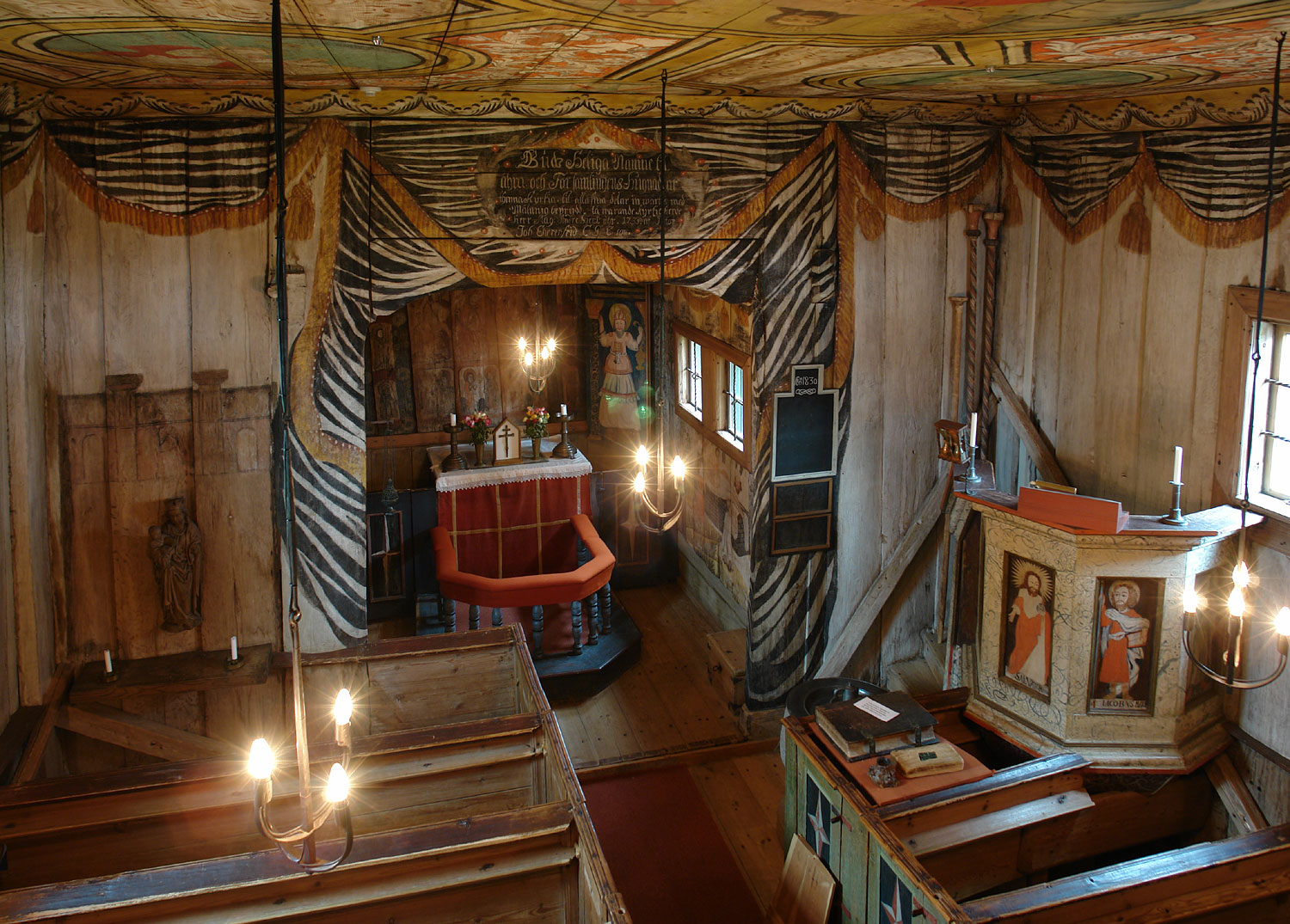
Interior

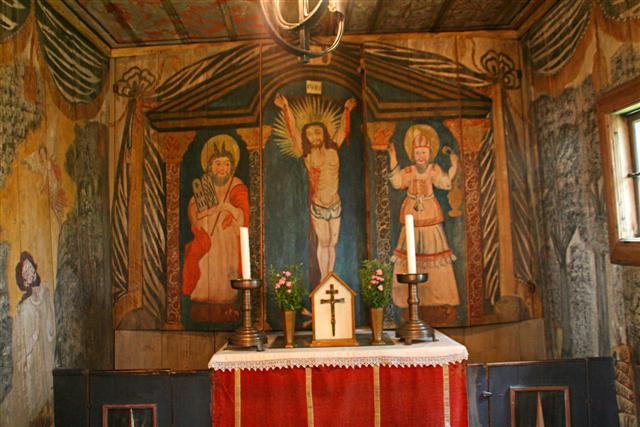
The choir with the altar.

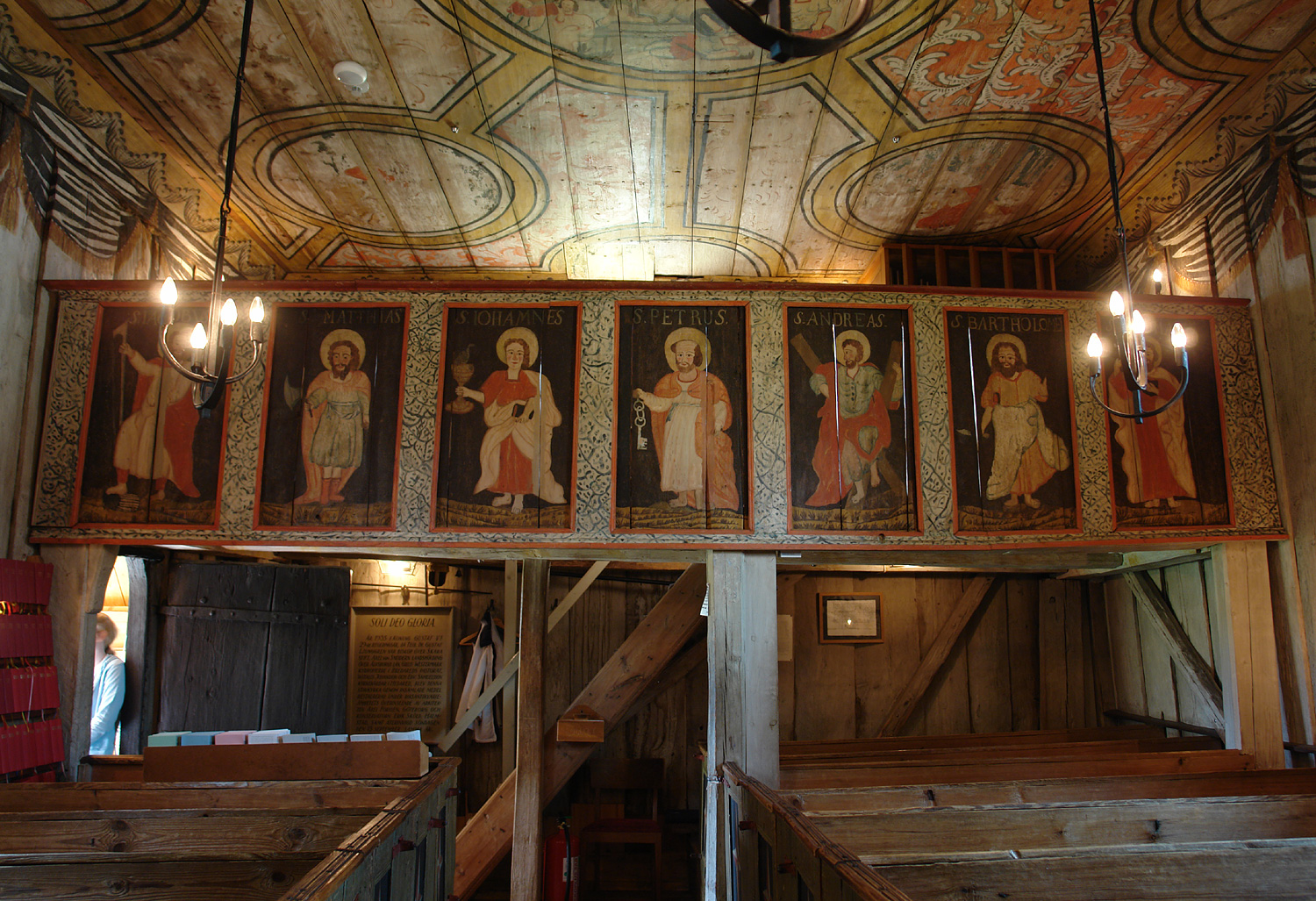
Platform.

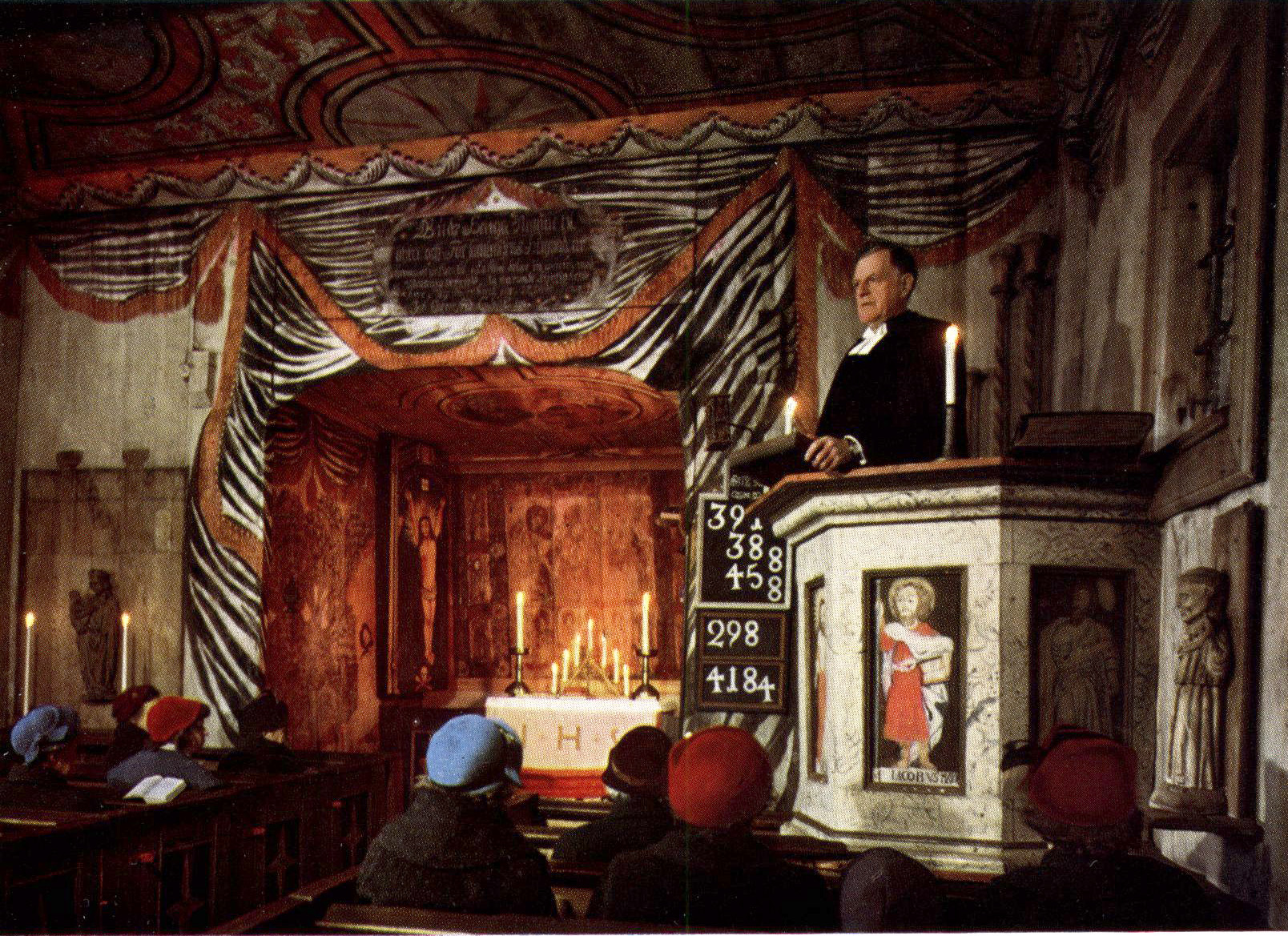
Worship, 1958
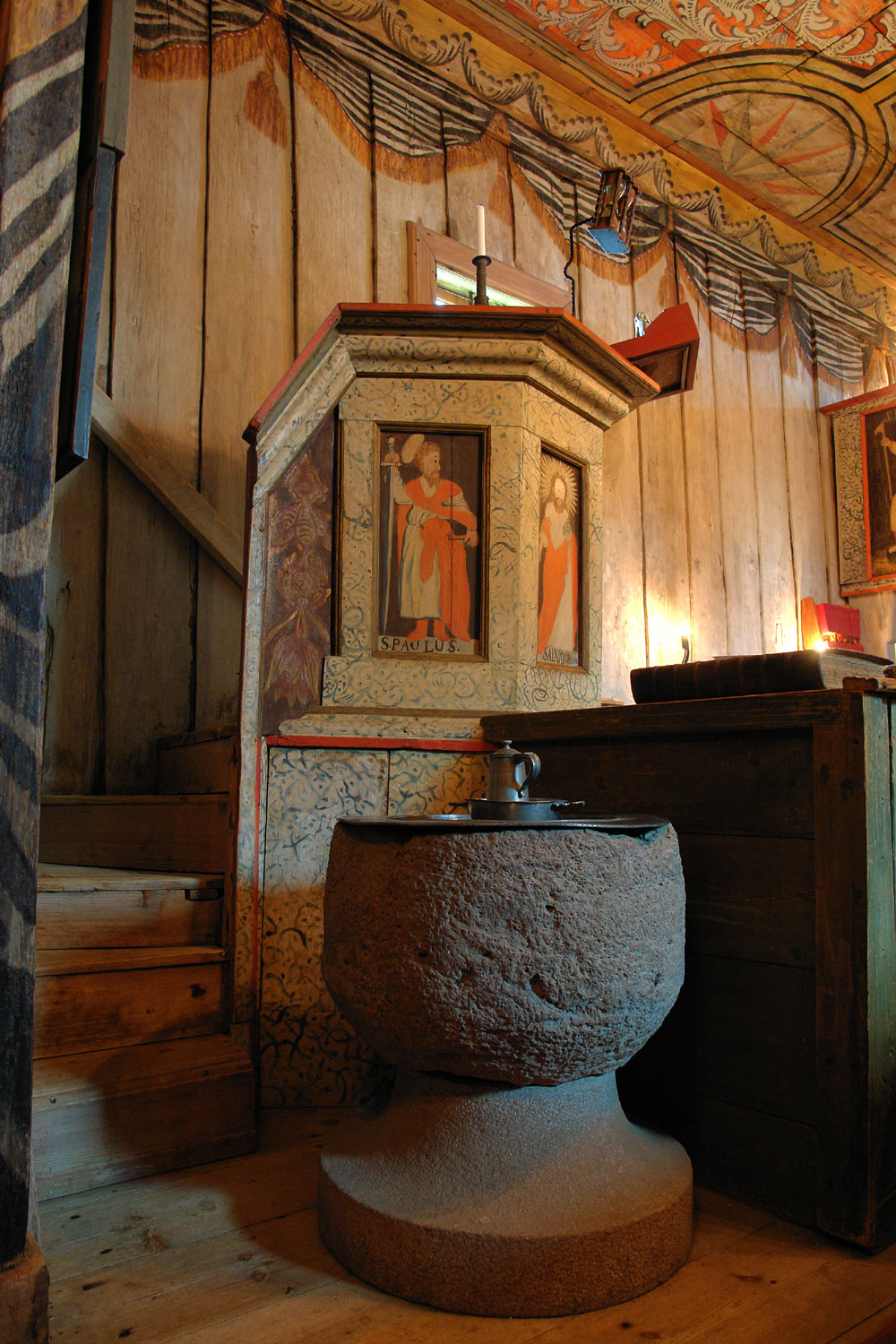
Baptismal font and pulpit.

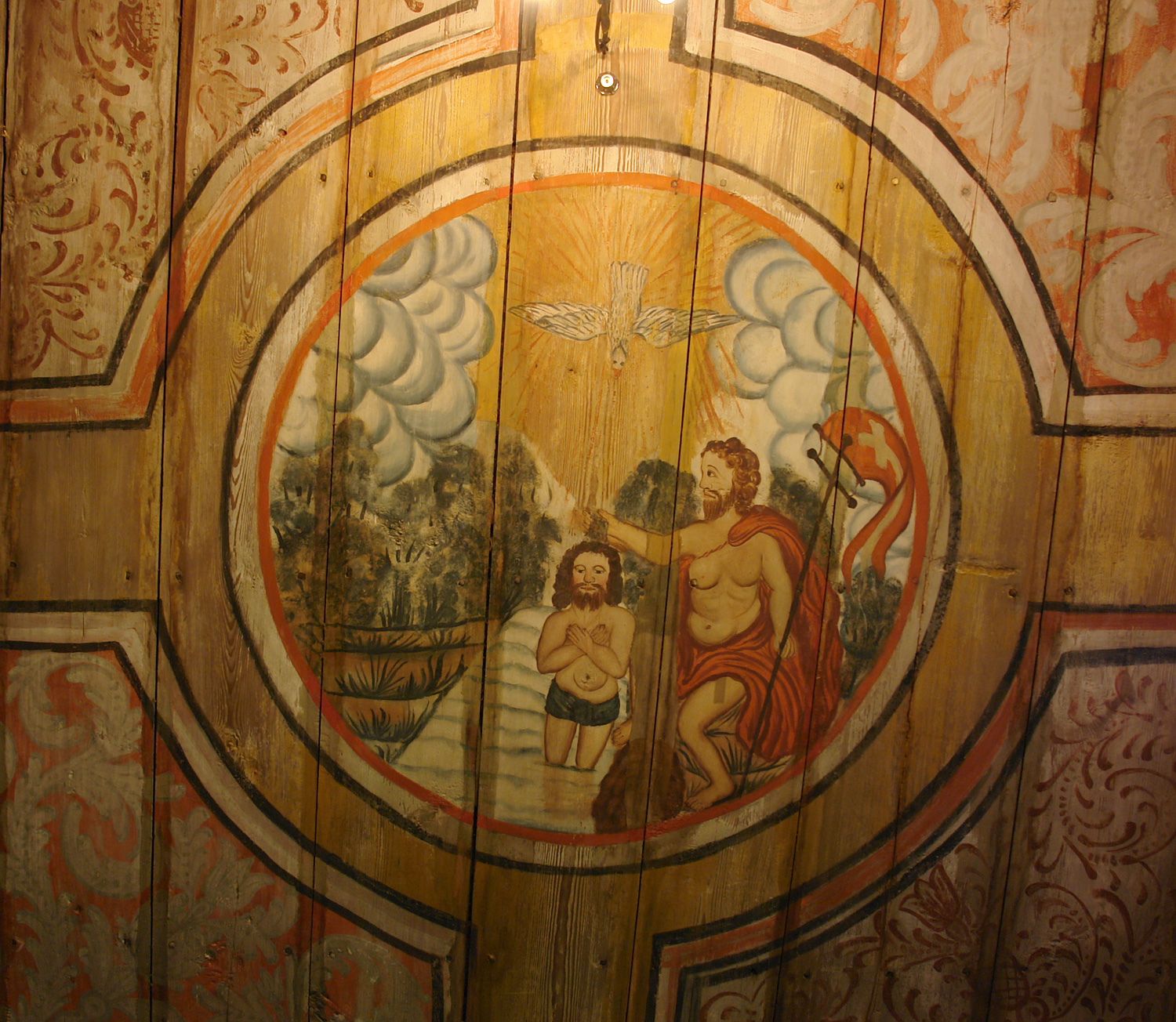
Jesus.

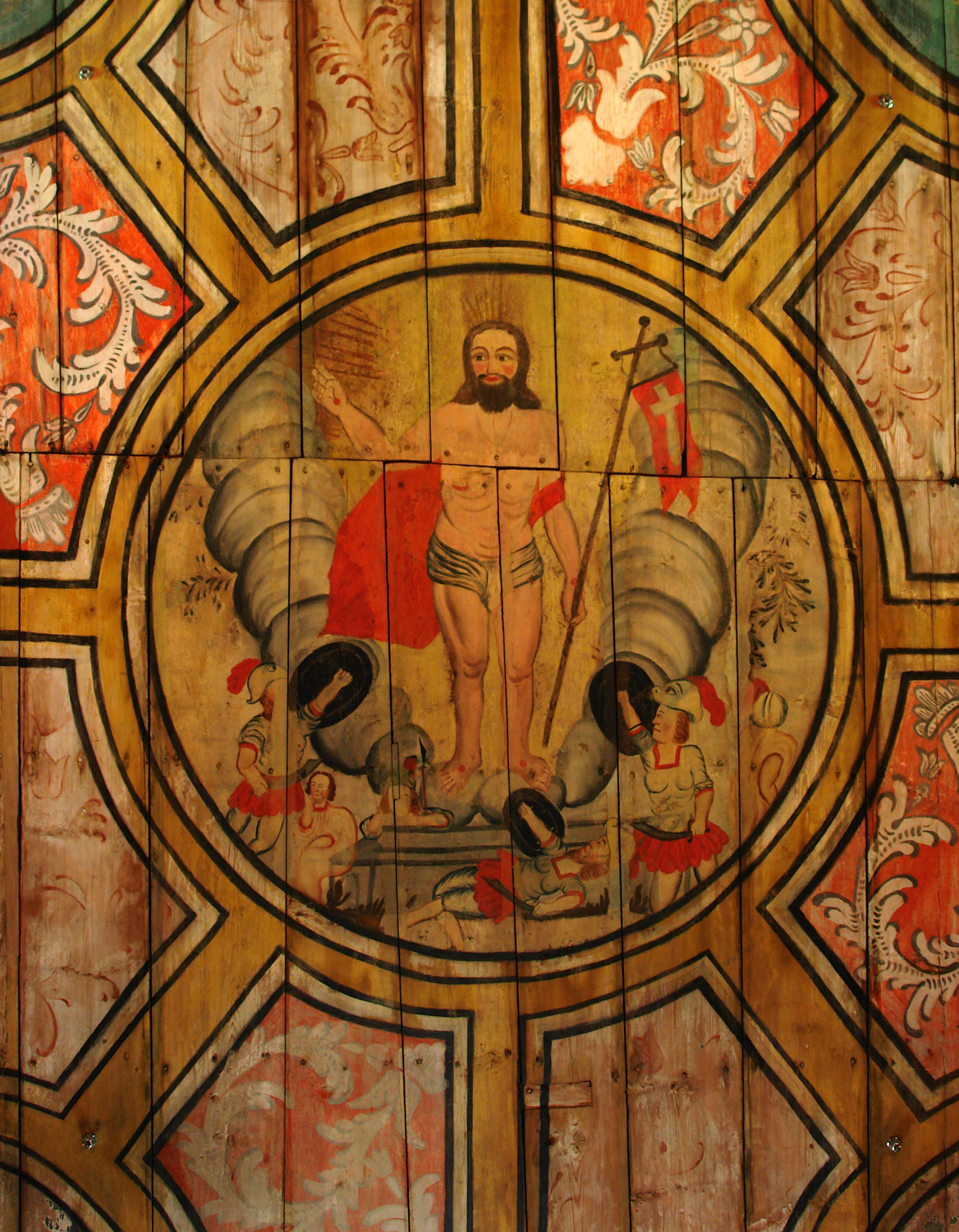
Ceiling painting: Resurrection of the Christ.

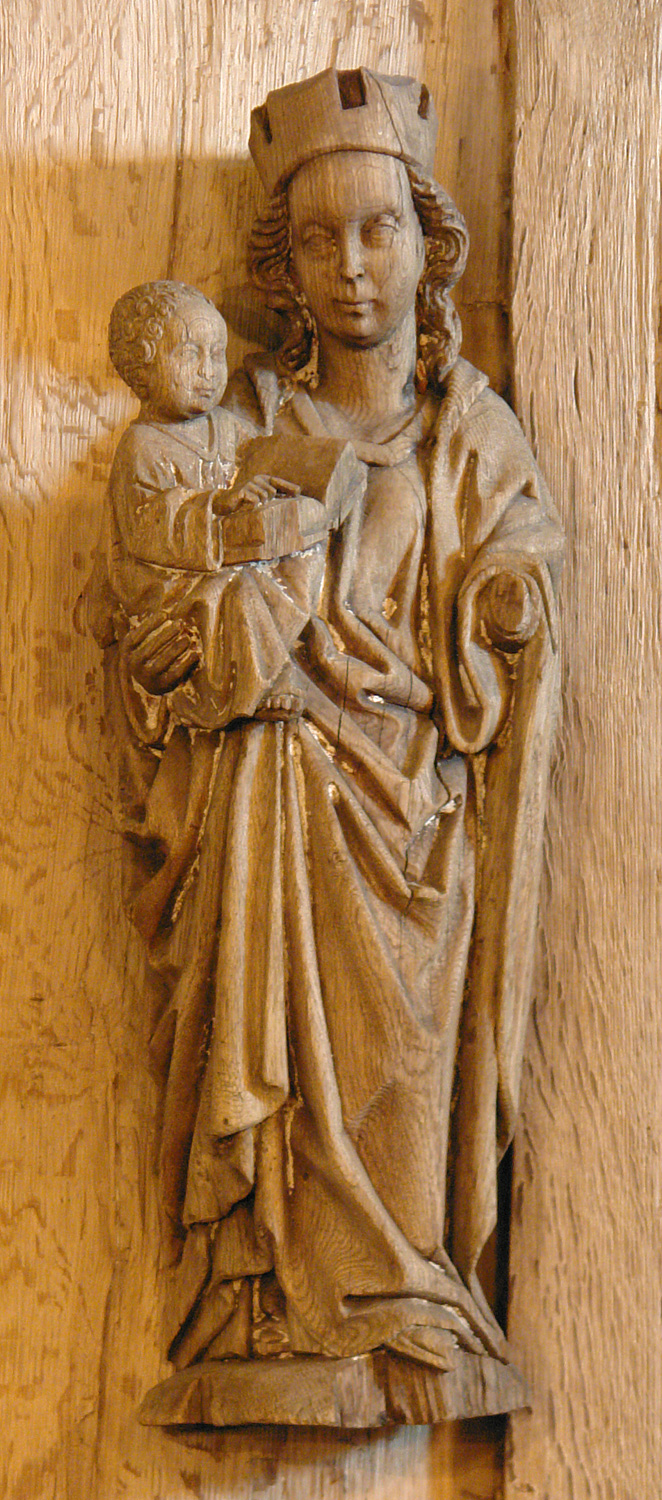
Madonna.

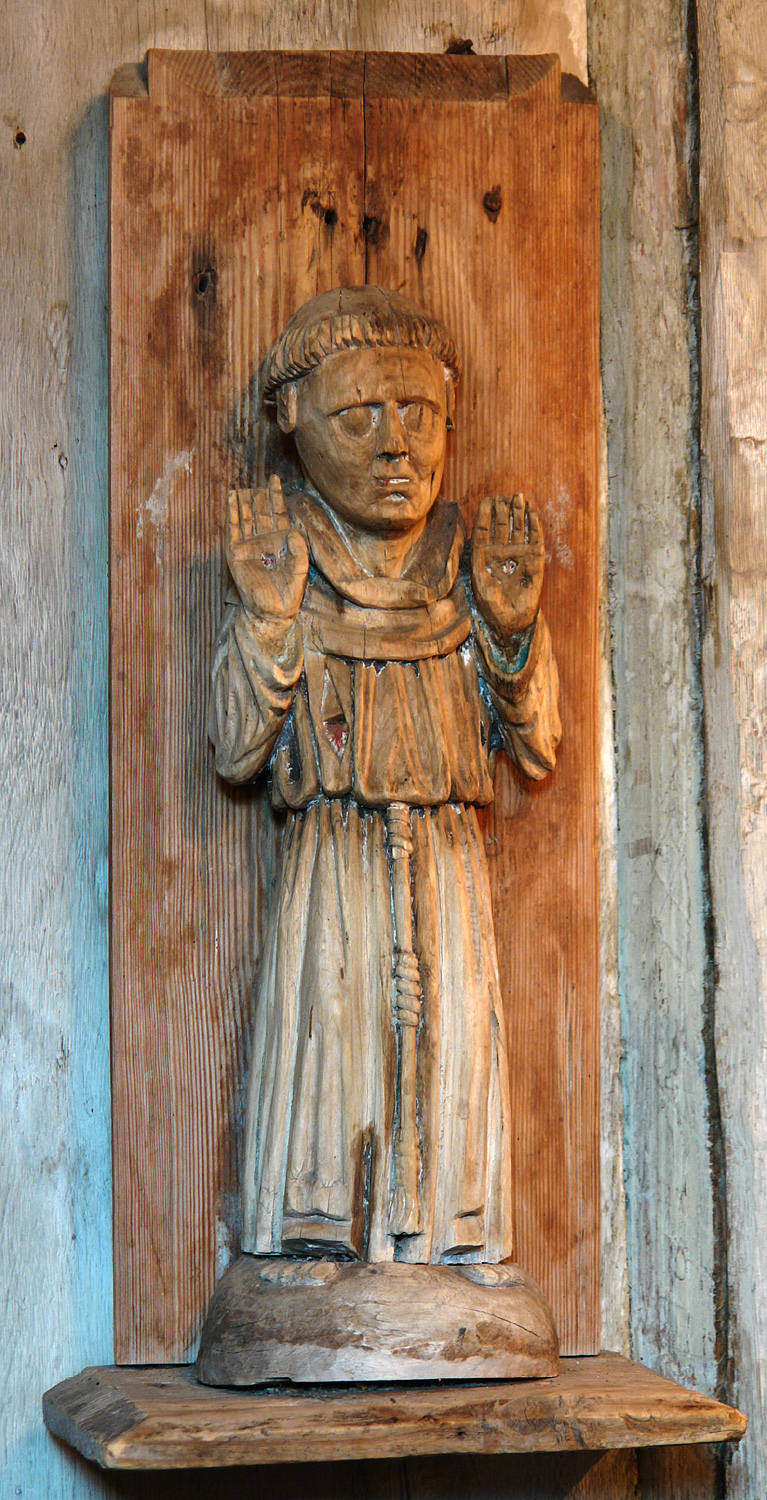
Francis of Assisi.
