= Røn Church =

Church in Innlandet, Norway

- Røn kyrkje
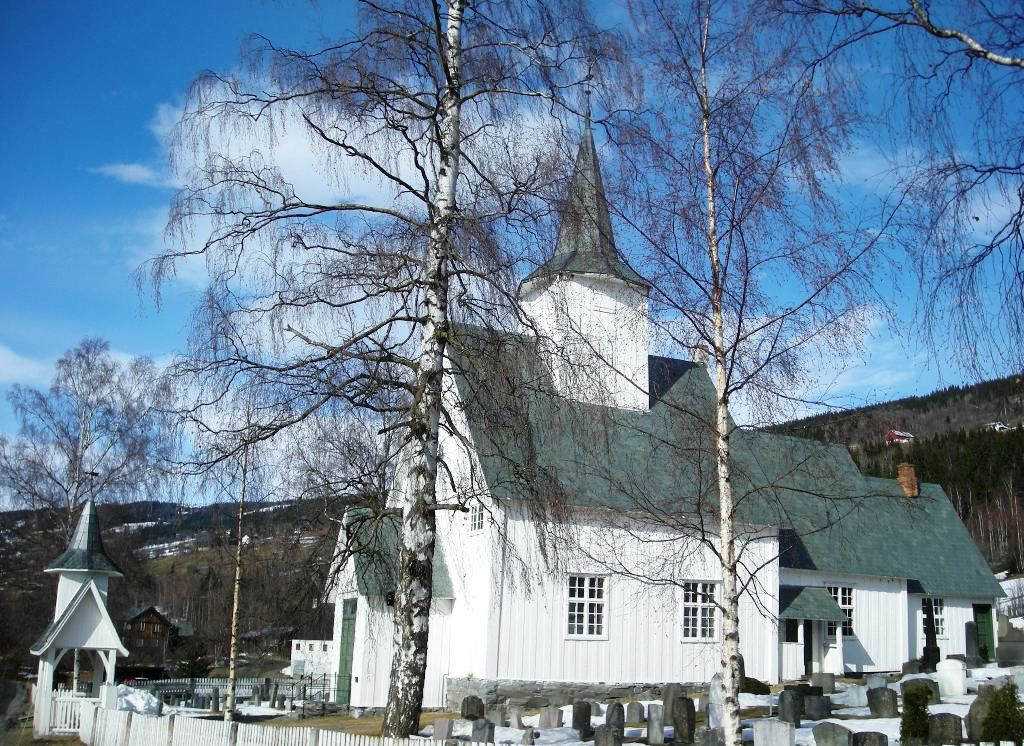
- View of the church Credit: Jan-Tore Egge
- Røn Church
- 61°02′50″N 9°02′59″E
- Location: Vestre Slidre, Innlandet
- Country: Norway
- Denomination: Church of Norway
- Churchmanship: Evangelical Lutheran

History
- Status: Parish church
- Founded: 1748
- Consecrated: 24 February 1749

Architecture
- Functional status: Active
- Architectural type: Long church
- Completed: 1748 (278 years ago)

Specifications
- Capacity: 120
- Materials: Wood

Administration
- Diocese: Hamar bispedømme
- Deanery: Valdres prosti
- Parish: Røn
- Norwegian Cultural Heritage Site
- Type: Church
- Status: Automatically protected
- ID: 85337

Røn Church (Norwegian: Røn kyrkje) is a parish church of the Church of Norway in Vestre Slidre Municipality in Innlandet county, Norway. It is located in the village of Røn. It is one of the churches for the Røn parish which is part of the Valdres prosti (deanery) in the Diocese of Hamar. The white, wooden church was built in a long church design in 1748 using plans drawn up by an unknown architect. The church seats about 120 people.

== History ==
In 1746, the parish began planning to close two old churches: Øyjar Church and Fystro Church. The plan was to close the old churches and then build a new church in the village of Røn, about halfway between the two older churches. In 1747–1748, a new wooden long church was built in Røn, using some of the old salvaged materials from the two old churches. The new building was completed and put into use on 8 December 1748, but it was not consecrated until 24 February 1749. In the early 1800s, a small church porch was built on the west end of the nave. During the 1920s, a new sacristy was built on the east end of the chancel.

== Media gallery ==
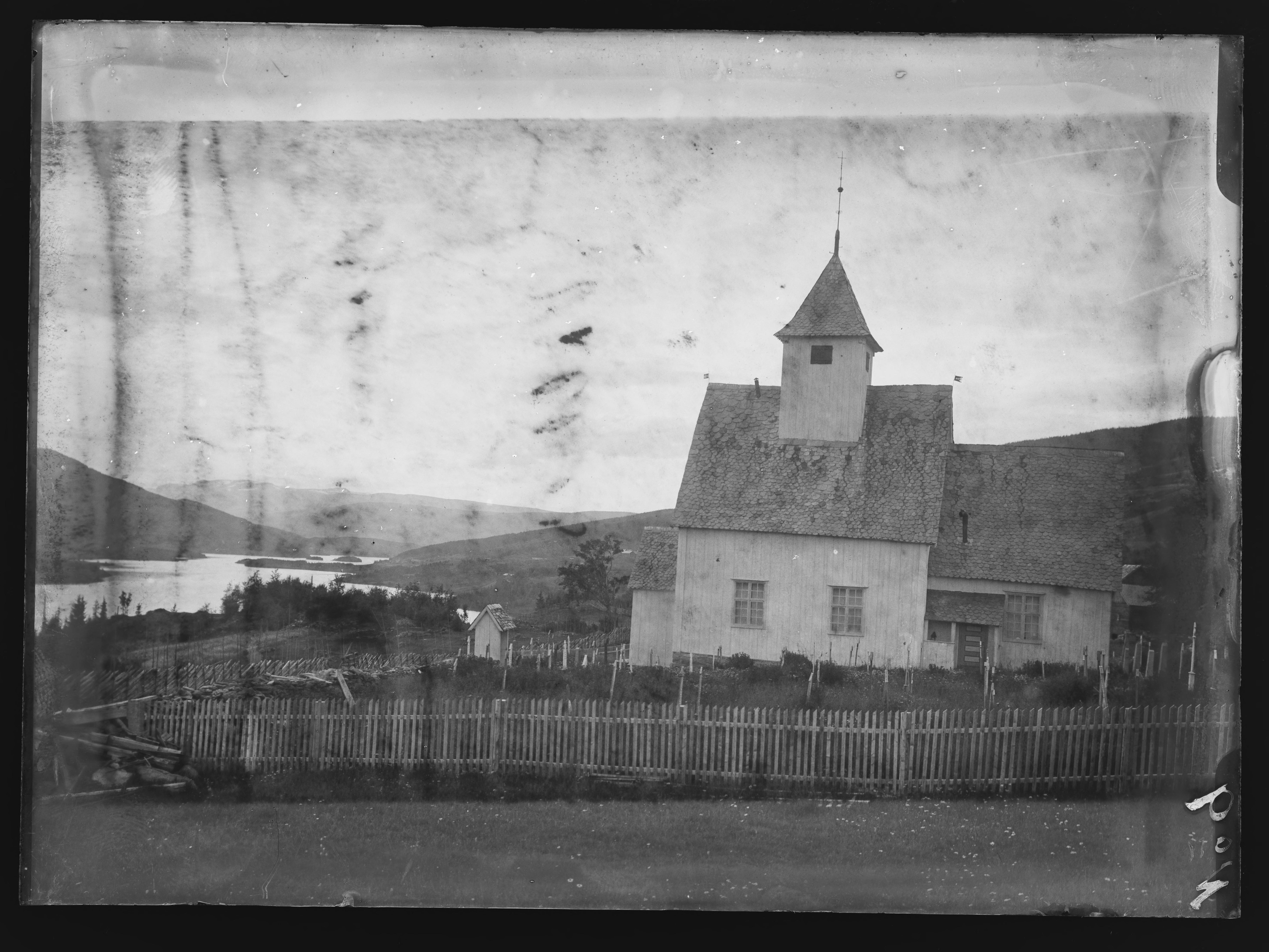

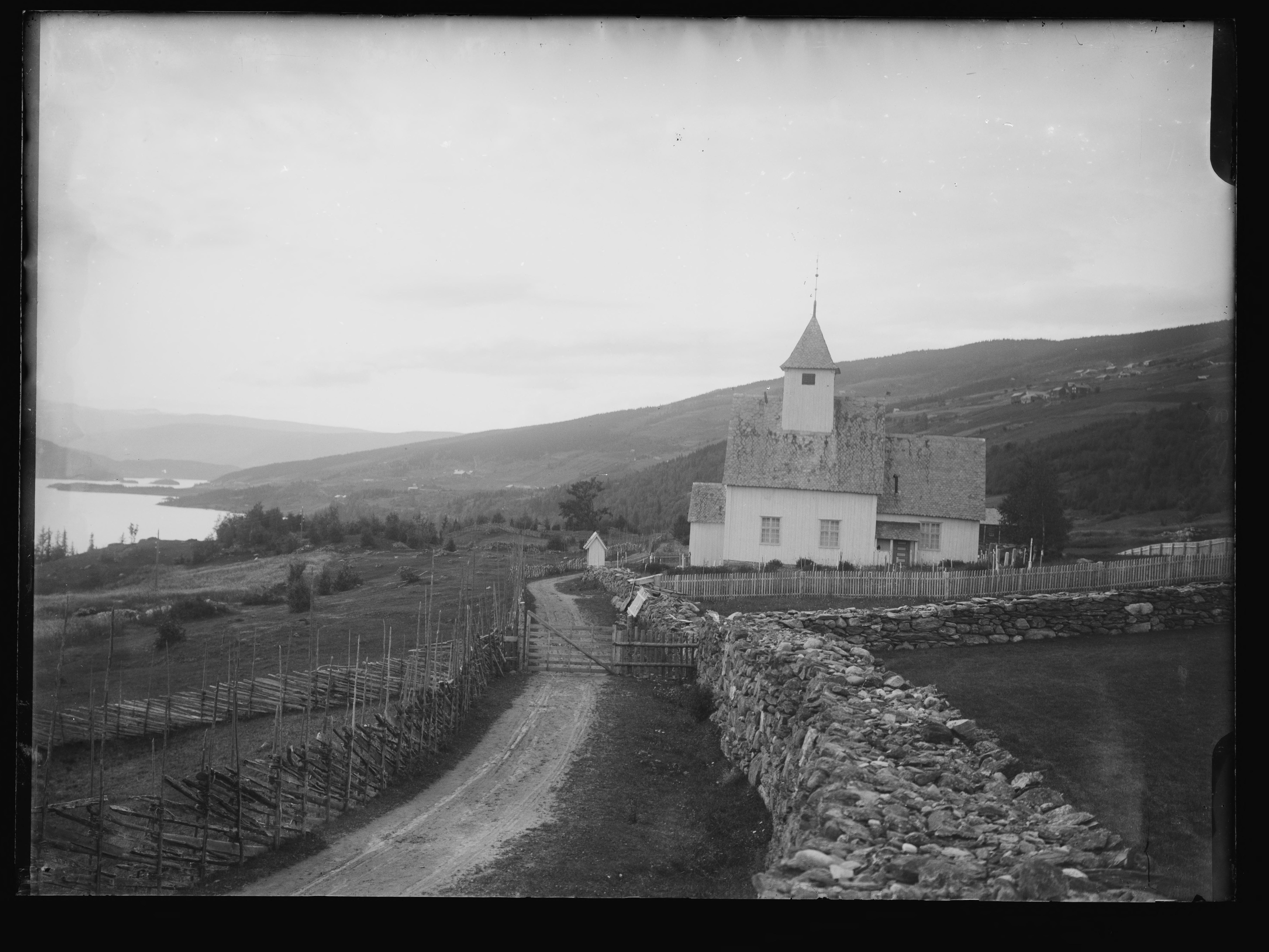

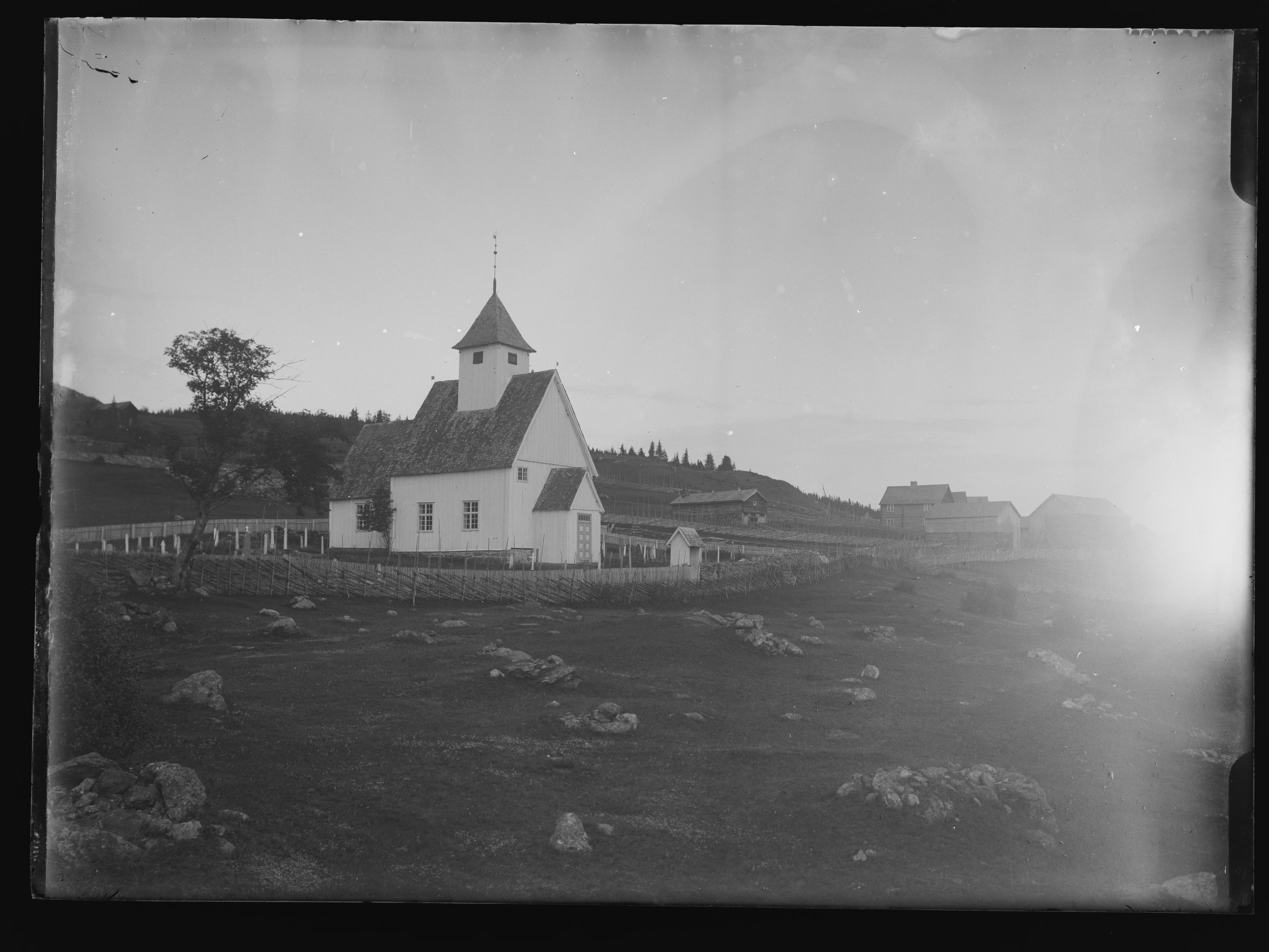

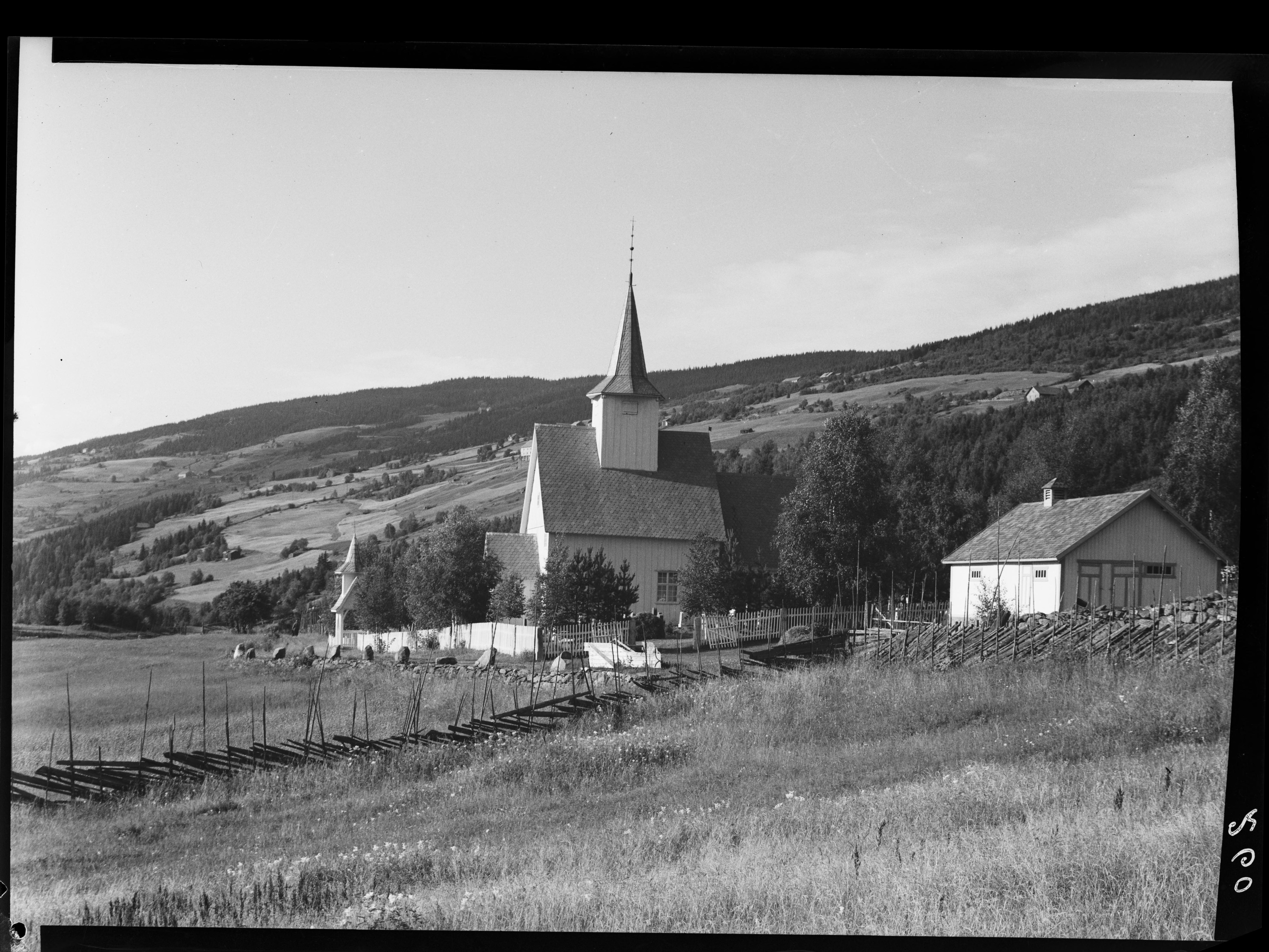

== See also ==
- List of churches in Hamar
