= Palisade church =

Type of church building

A palisade church is a church building that is constructed with palisade walls, standing split logs of timber, rammed directly into the ground, set in gravel or resting on a sill. The palisade walls form an integral part of the load-bearing system.

== Construction ==
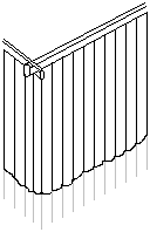
Palisade walls

This type of construction is often believed to predate a construction method with posts set directly into the earth, sometimes called a post church, and the later stave construction method, or stave church. A palisade church often had its walls set fully or partly in gravel and therefore they can be detected in archaeological surveys. Sometimes a new church was built around an existing one, and remnants of the old church can be found under the floor.

The palisade church construction itself consisted, in its simplest form, of posts set closely together into a trench in the earth, with the roof resting directly on top of the logs. Later the logs were split in two halves, with the flat side facing into the enclosed room. The edges could be straight, or tongued and grooved.

To prevent rapid deterioration, the logs or stave-planks were charred at the lower end and impregnated with pine-tar. The rows of stave-planks also rested in a ditch of gravel. Nevertheless, they were still susceptible to damp and eventually deteriorated.

For a long time it was assumed that this style of church building had disappeared before the year 1000, yet later research has shown it to be quite common as late as the 13th century. No such church exists in Norway, nor is there found any remnants of any such church, even though most of the stave churches in existence today are located in Norway.

Only one palisade church is known to survive: Greensted Church in Essex, England, which still has its massive palisade walls. Although much debated, it is often classified as the remnants of a palisade church or, more loosely, as a stave church. For a long time this church was assumed to be the world's oldest wooden church, as a dendrochronological dating estimated its construction to 845 CE. A later analysis has reset the date of the timbers to 1053 CE (+10/55 years).

== See also ==
- Stave church
- Post church
- Greensted Church
- Hemse Stave Church
