= Hemse Church =

- Hemse kyrka
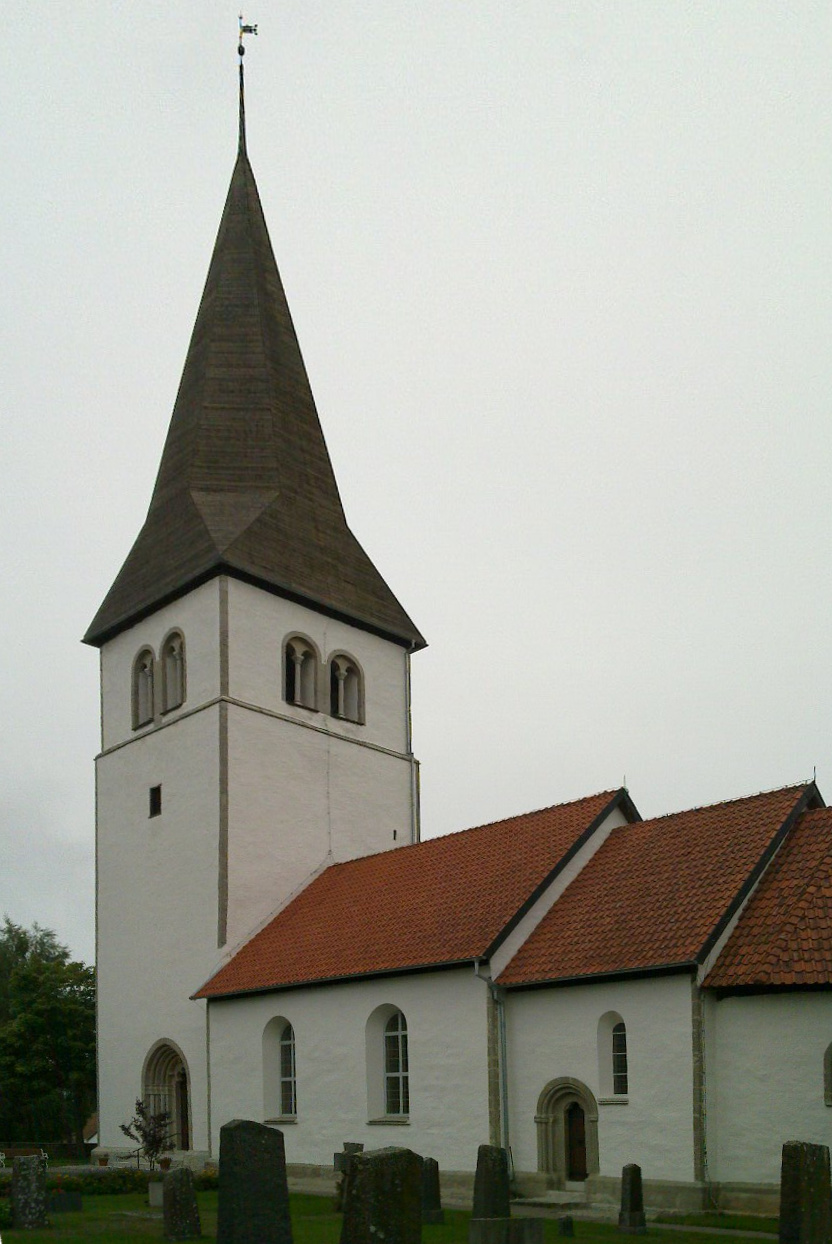
- Hemse Church, view of the exterior

- Location on Gotland
- 57°13′58″N 18°22′23″E
- Country: Sweden
- Denomination: Church of Sweden

Administration
- Diocese: Visby

Hemse Church (Swedish: Hemse kyrka) is a medieval Lutheran church in Hemse on the island of Gotland. Preceded by the most well-preserved early stave church discovered in Sweden, the current church dates mainly from the 13th century. It contains sets of medieval murals as well as some medieval furnishings. It is part of the Diocese of Visby (Church of Sweden).

== History ==
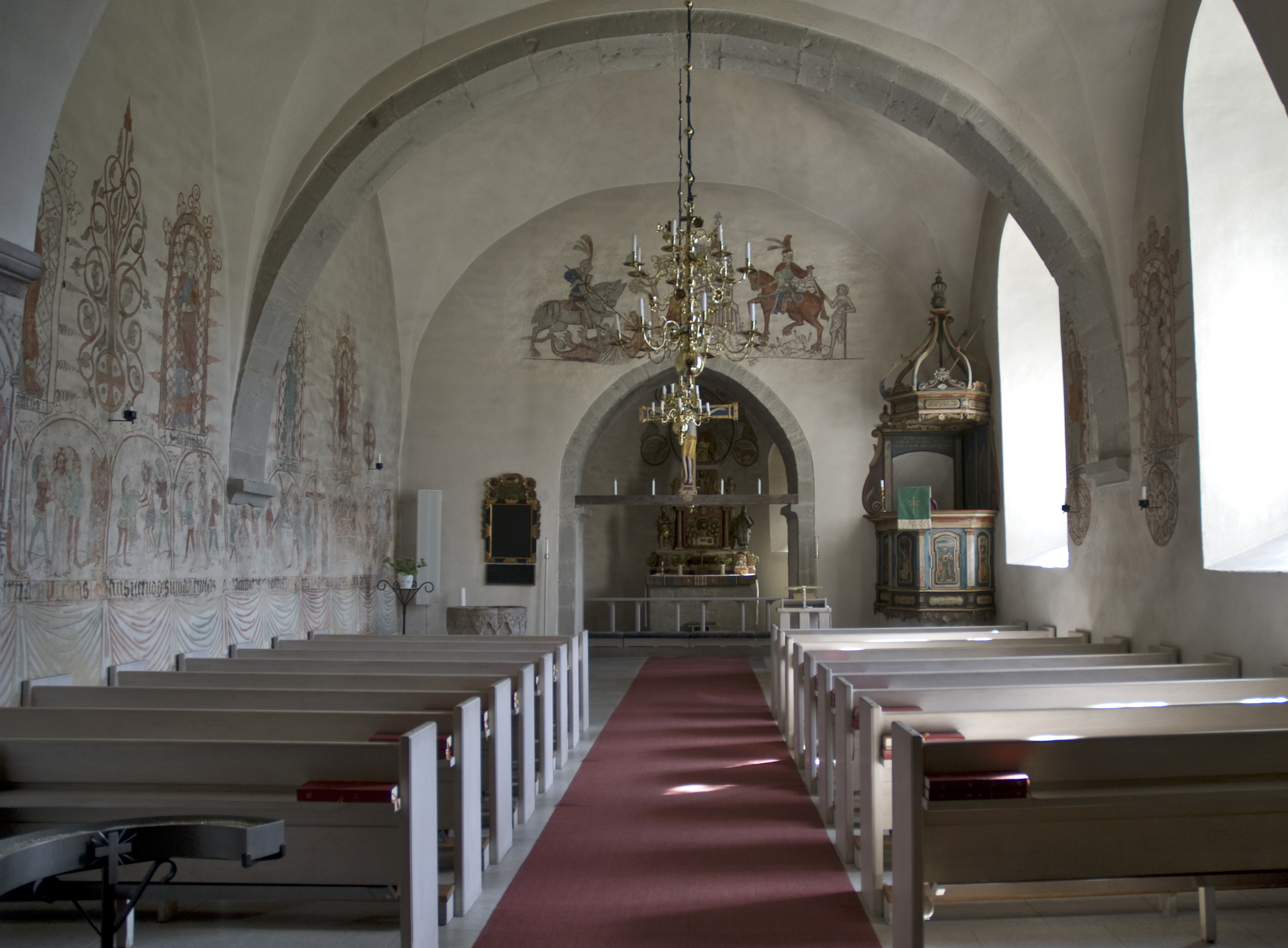
View of the interior towards the choir

The current stone church in Hemse dates mainly from the 13th century. However, about a century earlier there was a stave church built at the same location. The surprisingly well-preserved stave church was found by chance under the floor of the stone church during a restoration in 1896, where the wooden planks of the church had served as an earlier floor. The wooden church, known as Hemse Stave Church, is the most well-preserved early stave church found in Sweden. There have been plans to erect a replica of the church somewhere near its original location.

The stave church was probably replaced by the presently visible Romanesque stone church as it became too small for the congregation. The nave and choir were built first, and somewhat later the tower was added.

During the aforementioned restoration the church was rather insensitively restored inside. A later restoration was carried out in 1962–63.

== Architecture ==
The church is a relatively homogeneous Romanesque edifice. Inside, it is decorated by medieval murals. The oldest of these are in the tower, and depict centaurs assaulting the tree of life. Under it are two inscriptions in Latin. In the choir and the apse are depictions of the Last Judgment dating from the 14th century and in the nave, murals from the middle of the 15th century depicting the Passion of Christ and two saints: Saint George and the Dragon and Saint Martin. There is also a rune inscription on the western wall of the choir, a repetition of the futhark or runic "alphabet".

Among the furnishings, the triumphal cross from the end of the 12th century is noteworthy. The baptismal font has a Romanesque foot but a later (14th century) basin. The church bell is from the first half of the 15th century.

== See also ==
- Hemse Stave Church
