= Andreas Faye =

Norwegian priest, folklorist and historian

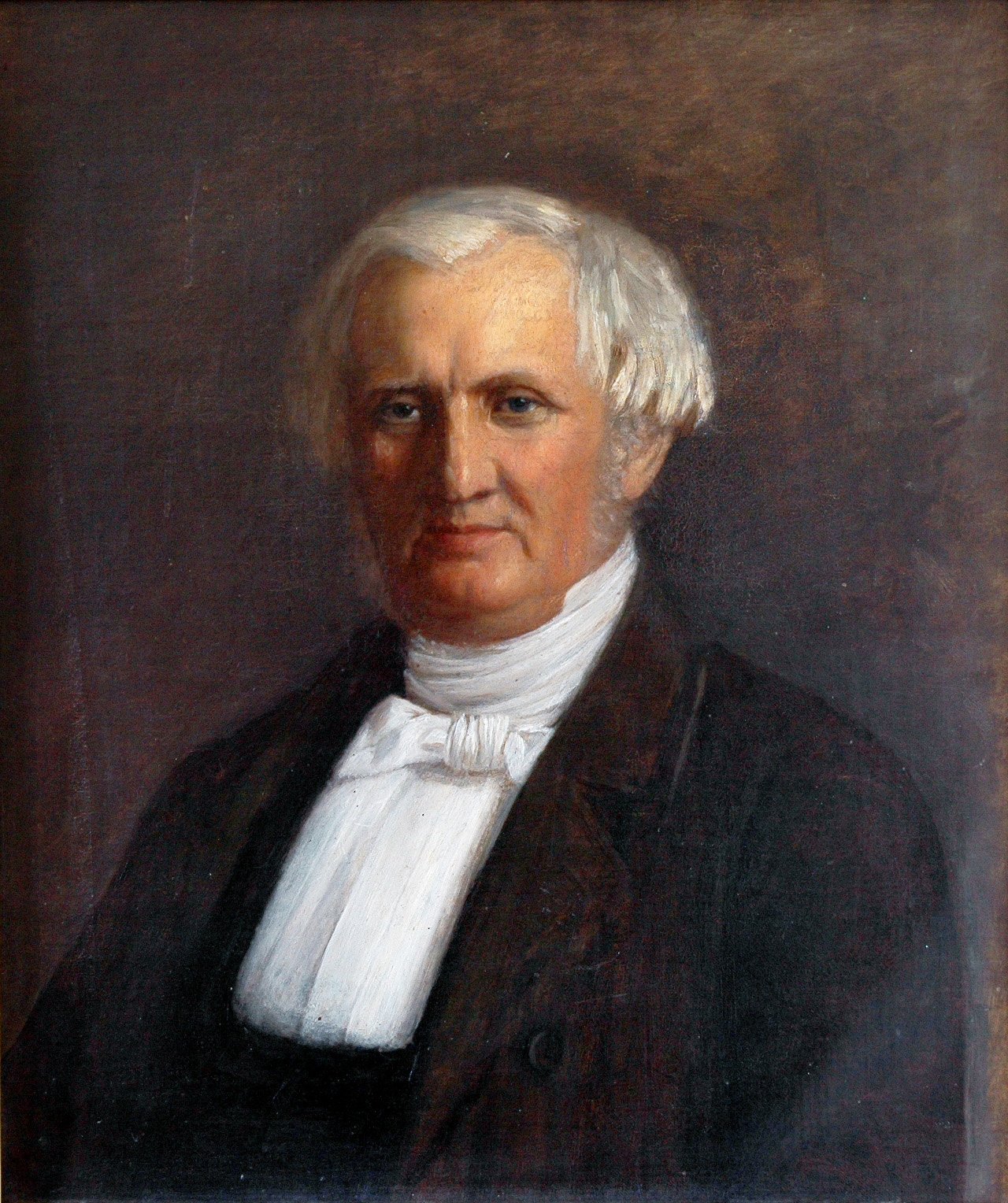
Andreas Faye; portrait by Christiane Schreiber

Andreas Faye (5 October 1802 – 5 May 1869) was a Norwegian priest, folklorist and historian.

He was born in the neighborhood of Bragernes (now part of Drammen) in Buskerud, Norway. He was the son of Christopher Faye (1772–1825) and Maren Mathea Borgen. He graduated after studying theology at the University of Christiania (now University of Oslo) in 1828. Faye was appointed vicar of Holt Church near Tvedestrand in 1833 and from 1839 he was also dean of Christianssands Stifts Seminarium in Kristiansand.

He contributed to newspapers and magazines, and published a number of books, including the first folklore collection in Norway. Among his books are Norges Historie til Brug ved Ungdommens Underviisning from 1831, Norske Sagn from 1833, and Udtog af Norges Historie from 1834. He was elected to the Storting in 1842 from the constituency Nedenæs og Raabygdelagets Amt (now Aust-Agder) and was decorated as a Knight of the Order of St. Olav in 1866. In 1861, he was appointed parish priest at Sande Church in Vestfold where he died in 1869.
