= Hemse Stave Church =

Building on Gotland, Sweden

Coordinates: 57°13′59″N 18°22′23″E

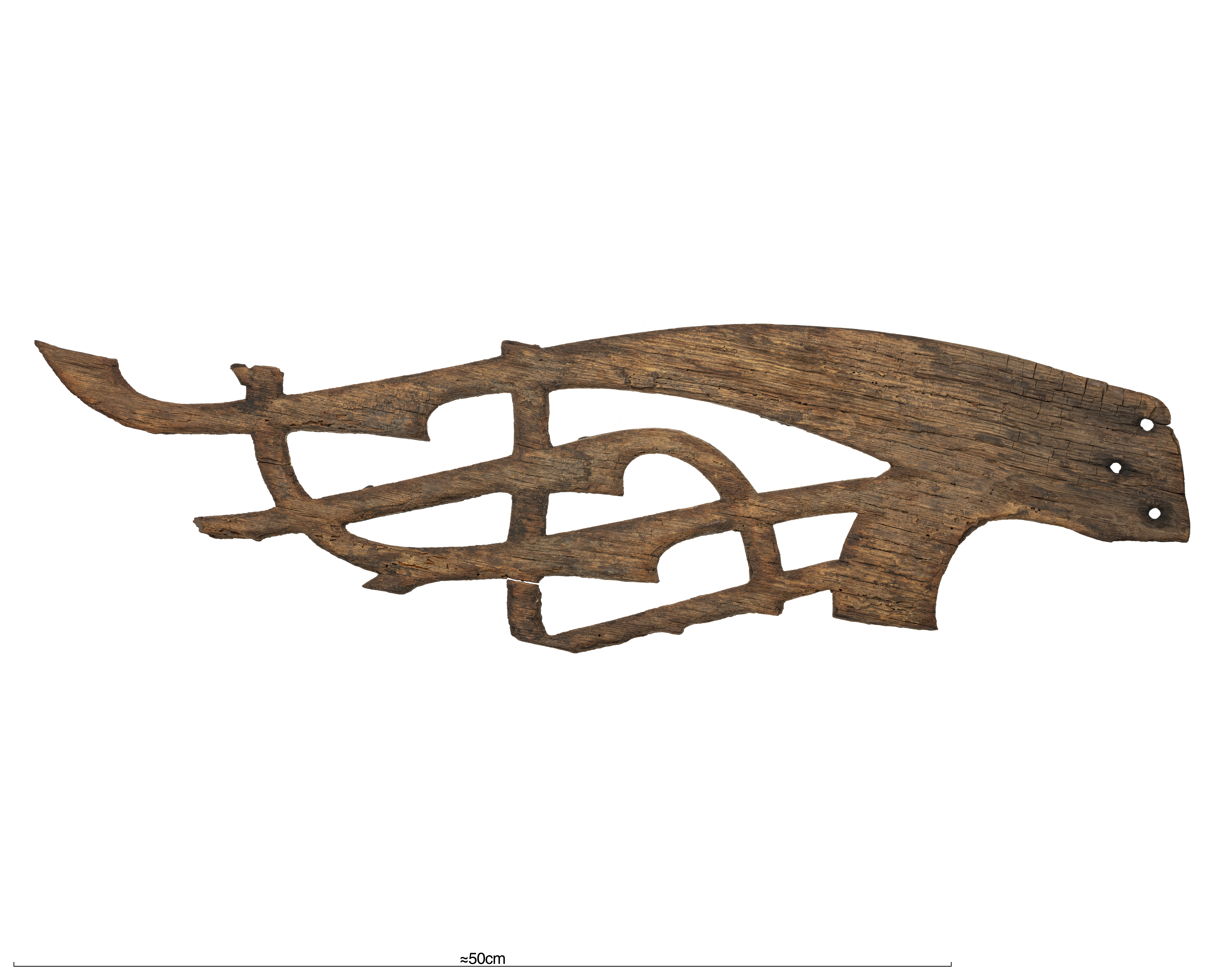
Ornament

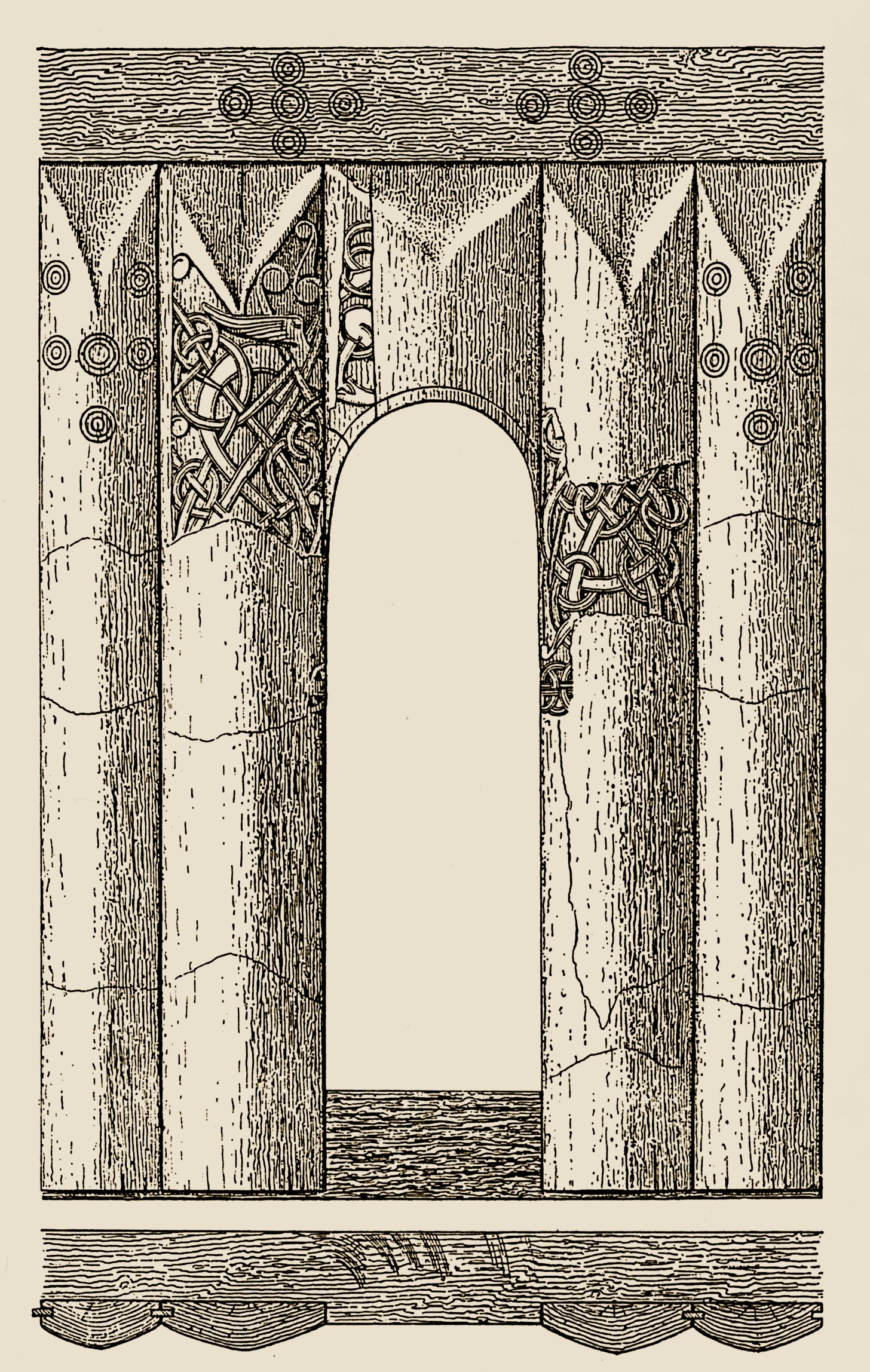
Drawing of the portal

Hemse Stave Church is a rediscovered stave church from Hemse at Gotland, Sweden.

Before the present Hemse Church was built there was a stave church from the early Christian period in the beginning of the 11th century. The solid and richly ornamented stave planks of oak was used as a wooden floor in the present church. This stave church, or perhaps palisade church with sills (since it is unclear how the corners were constructed), is the only more or less complete church rediscovered from the Christianization of Sweden.

It was held in storage at Statens historiska museum in Stockholm, although some remains are on display at the Gotland Museum in Visby. In 2023, the church is the focus of a research project with the University of Gothenburg and the Swedish History Museum.

The stave church has been replaced by a stone church, which was finished in the 13th century.

During a renovation of this church in 1896, parts of the stave church were discovered, where the wood pieces of the stave church had been reused for building the floor of the current church.

== Surviving stave church ==
The only surviving stave church in Sweden is in Hedared.
