= Post church =

Type of church building

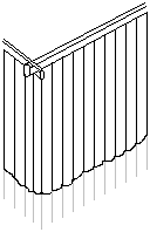
Pallisade construction

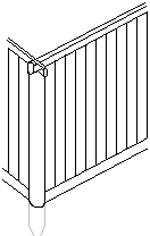
Earthfast corner posts, the wall planks land on a sill.

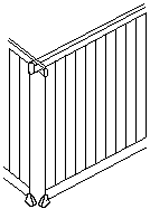
Fully developed sill, as used on most stave churches.

Post church (Norwegian: stolpekirke) is a term for a church building which predates the stave churches and differ in that the corner posts do not reside on a sill but instead have posts dug into the earth. Posts are the vertical, roof-bearing timbers that were placed in the excavated post holes. Posts were often placed in trenches filled with stone, but were still susceptible to decay.

This type of construction is often believed to be an intermediate form between a palisade construction and a stave construction. Because the holes for the posts are easily detected in archaeological surveys they can be differentiated from the other two, even if none of the original post churches have survived.

There is some debate over whether one stave church, the one at Røldal in Hardanger, Norway is in fact a post church. During restoration work it was noted that the posts seemed to touch the ground but as the church had sunken into ground it was difficult to verify if it was indeed a post church or a stave church. The only unquestionable indication of the origin of this church is the construction whereby the sill is tapped into the corner post, while in the more common stave church construction of this type the corner post stands on top of the sill.

== See also ==
- Palisade church
