= Helland (surname) =

Helland is a Norwegian surname which may refer to:

- Amund Helland (1846–1918), Norwegian geologist, politician and non-fiction writer
- Bjørn Helland-Hansen (1877–1957), Norwegian pioneer in the field of modern oceanography
- Eivind Helland (born 2005), Norwegian footballer
- Eric Helland, American Professor of Economics at Claremont McKenna College
- Erik Jonsson Helland (1816–1868), Norwegian Hardanger fiddle maker from Bø in Telemark
- Gunleik Jonsson Helland (1828–1863), Norwegian Hardanger fiddle maker from Bø in Telemark.
- Gunnar Gunnarsson Helland (1885–1976), Norwegian-American Hardanger fiddle maker
- Gunnar Olavsson Helland (1852–1938), Norwegian Hardanger fiddle maker from Bø in Telemark
- Ingolv Helland, Norwegian portraitist who has an international reputation
- John Gunnarsson Helland (1897–1977), Norwegian Hardanger fiddle maker from Bø in Telemark
- Jon Eriksson Helland (1790–1862), Norwegian Hardanger violin maker from Bø in Telemark
- Jon Eriksson Helland II (1849–1869), Norwegian Hardanger fiddle maker from Bø in Telemark
- Kjell Helland, Norwegian politician for the Labour Party
- Knut Eriksson Helland (1851–1880), Norwegian Hardanger fiddle maker from Bø in Telemark, Norway
- Knut Gunnarsson Helland (1880–1920), Norwegian-American Hardanger fiddle maker
- Kristian Helland, Norwegian politician from the Christian Democratic Party
- Olav Gunnarsson Helland (1875–1946), Norwegian Hardanger fiddle maker from Bø in Telemark
- Pål André Helland, Norwegian football player
- Roger Helland, Norwegian football (soccer) player
- Sverre Helland (1924–2007), Norwegian politician for the Centre Party
- Thor Helland, Norwegian long-distance runner

== See also ==
- Helland (fiddle makers)
- Helland House, Norway, named after Peter Helland (1847–1935)
