= Leif Rygg =

Norwegian musician (1940–2018)

- Born: 3 May 1940; Voss Municipality, Norway
- Died: 4 February 2018 (aged 77)
- Occupation: Fiddler
- Awards: Spellemannprisen; King's Medal of Merit in gold (2010)

Leif Rygg (3 May 1940 – 4 February 2018) was a Norwegian hardingfele fiddle player and folk music instructor.

Rygg was born in Voss Municipality and learned traditional fiddle playing from Sigbjørn Bernhoft Osa, Lars Skjervheim and Anders Kjerland. His albums include Nøringen from 1980 (jointly with Knut Hamre), Bjølleslåtten from 1994, a collection of traditional tunes after Ola Mosafinn, in collaboration with Knut Buen and Kåre Nordstoga, and which was awarded Spellemannprisen, and Lengt from 1995.

He was named honorary member of the Norwegian National Association for Traditional Music and Dance in 1998, and received the King's Medal of Merit in gold in 2010.

He received the Rff award from Rådet for folkemusikk og folkedans for 2010.

He died on 4 February 2018.
