= Buen =

Buen is a Norwegian surname. Notable people with the surname include:

- Anders Buen (1864–1933), Norwegian typographer, newspaper editor, trade unionist, and politician
- Hauk Buen (1933–2021), Norwegian hardingfele fiddler and fiddle maker
- Kari Buen (1938–2025), Norwegian sculptor
- Knut Buen (born 1948), Norwegian fiddler, composer, folklorist, and publisher

== See also ==
- Buin-e Olya
