= Eilev Jonsson Steintjønndalen =

- Born: c. 1821
- Origin: Bø, Telemark, Norway
- Died: 1876 (aged 54–55)
- Occupation: Fiddle maker

Eilev Jonsson Steintjønndalen (c. 1821–1876) was a Norwegian Hardanger fiddle maker from Bø in Telemark, Norway.

Eilev Jonsson Steintjønndalen was the younger brother of Erik Jonsson Helland. He learned the art of fiddle making from his father as well as from his elder brother. In 1845, he married Egelev Knudsdatter (1819-1883) and moved to Steintjønndalen, a cotter's sub-farm on the Nordigard Folkestad farm a few miles away from the rest of his family. He took the name of the farm, started his own workshop and made fiddles until his death in 1876.

== See also ==
- The Helland fiddle maker family

== Related Reading ==
- Aksdal, Bjørn (2009) Hardingfela felemakere og instrumentets utvikling (Trondheim: Tapir Akademisk Forlag) ISBN 978-82-519-2402-3
