= Helland Brothers =

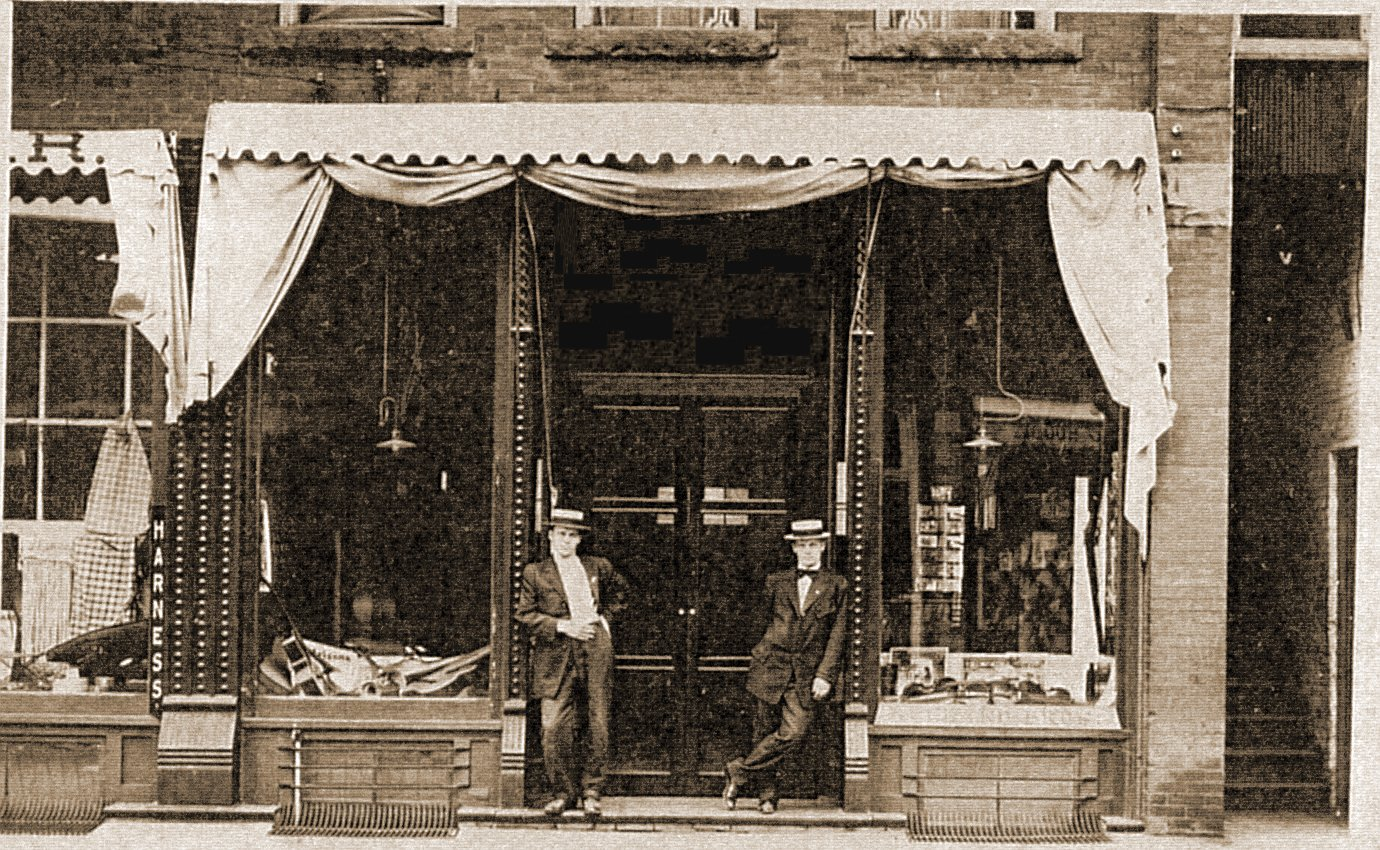
Knut and Gunnar outside their fiddle workshop in Chippewa Falls. Picture taken before 1920.

Helland Brothers was a fiddle makers' shop in Chippewa Falls, Wisconsin, United States, 1905–1927.

The workshop was founded in 1905 by the brothers Knut Gunnarsson Helland and Gunnar Gunnarsson Helland, fourth generation violin makers, from Bø Municipality in Telemark county Norway. They emigrated to America in 1901 and made both Hardanger fiddles and violins. Knut died, supposedly of typhoid fever in 1920. Gunnar Gunnarson Helland ran the workshop alone until 1927, when it was closed due to the failure of the fiddle market.

== See also ==
- The Helland fiddle maker family
