= Gunnar Helland =

Gunnar Helland may refer to:

- Gunnar Gunnarsson Helland (1889–1976), Norwegian-American Hardanger fiddle maker
- Gunnar Olavsson Helland (1852–1938), Norwegian Hardanger fiddle maker
