= Knut Knutsson Steintjønndalen =

Norwegian Hardanger fiddle maker

Knut Steintjønndalen in his workshop 1963 at the age of 76

Knut Knutsson Steintjønndalen (22 November 1887 – 11 June 1969) was a Norwegian Hardanger fiddle maker from Bø in Telemark, Norway.

Before he died, Knut Eilevsson Steintjønndalen told his 15-year-old son Knut Knutsson to keep the tradition alive. Knut made his first Hardanger fiddle at age 15 and was paid approximately $1.50. 61 years later, in 1963, he was paid about $200. It took him about one month to complete one violin, and he produced about 800–900 fiddles during his life.

He worked every weekday from 7 a.m. until the late evening. There was no romanticism about this work. It was hard and tedious labour to keep a living.

== See also ==
- The Helland fiddle maker family
