= Bergslien =

Bergslien is a surname. Notable people with the surname include:

- Brynjulf Bergslien (1830–1898), Norwegian sculptor, brother of Knud
- Knud Bergslien (1827–1908), Norwegian painter, art teacher, and master artist
- Nils Bergslien (1853–1928), Norwegian illustrator, painter, and sculptor
