= Kivlemøyane =

Dairy maids in Norwegian folklore

Kivlemøyane (lit. 'The Kivle Maids') is the popular name of three dairy maids in Seljord Municipality in Telemark county, who according to legend were turned to stone. Their image is presented in a natural formation in the mountain of Skorve in the valley Kivledalen. The legend also formed the basis for a number of Norwegian folk tunes.

== The legend ==
This Norwegian legend tells of three maids who played their clarions during mass. Their music was so beautiful that all the attendants were distracted, and went out to listen to them instead of the priest. This angered the priest, who cursed the girls and turned them to stone. They are still visible in the mountain. After some sources, the minister involved was the last Roman Catholic priest in Seljord. The legend presents an orphic theme, and also indicates that the maids may have been seductive forest creatures (Hulders).

== Music connected to the legend ==
There are a number of folk tunes and dance tunes connected to this legend. In Seljord, a regular suite was performed and preserved, consisting of four separate tunes. The music was played on Willow flute and Hardanger fiddle. Many of the dances are fairly old. Most of this music derives from Seljord Municipality, and has been played in unbroken tradition from local fiddlers. Classical composer Edvard Grieg (1843–1907) arranged one of those dances for piano, and composer Eivind Groven (1901–1977) played and arranged another. There are in all some twelve to fifteen tunes sorted in three separate suites connected to the legend.

== Art connected to the legend ==
The legend was first recorded by Andreas Faye (1802–1869) who published Norske Folke-Sagn, a collection of Norwegian tales and legends in 1837. Later, versions of the tale is recorded by a number of folklorists, among then Magnus Brostrup Landstad, Rikard Berge and Knut Loupedalen. This version is from a collection of Norwegian folk tales and legends dated 1995 The folk tunes connected to the story were collected by Eivind Groven and Arne Bjørndal, as well as Johan Halvorsen.

Kivlemøyane was also featured in paintings by Norwegian illustrator and painter Johanna Bugge Berge (1874-1961).

== See also ==
- Stanton Drew stone circles
