= Knut Eriksson Helland =

Norwegian Hardanger fiddle maker

Knut Eriksson Helland (1851–1880) was a Norwegian Hardanger fiddle maker from Bø in Telemark, Norway.

Knut Eriksson Helland was the youngest son of Erik Jonsson Helland. He began to work in his father's workshop at an early age, and showed great skill, especially in making fiddle bridges and gripboards. When he was nine years old he made the bridge to one of the violins that Ole Bull had ordered.

After his father's death he continued his father's workshop. At first he worked alone, but he was later joined by his brother in-law, Gunnar Olavsson Helland to whom he taught the art of violin making.

Knut died at 29 years of age and Gunnar was the one to continue the tradition.

== See also ==
- The Helland fiddle maker family
