= Loretta Kelley =

American fiddler

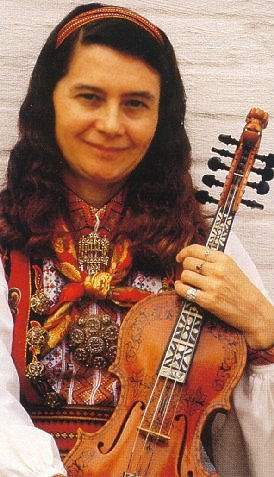
Loretta A. Kelley with her Norwegian Hardanger fiddle made by Hauk Buen, Norway

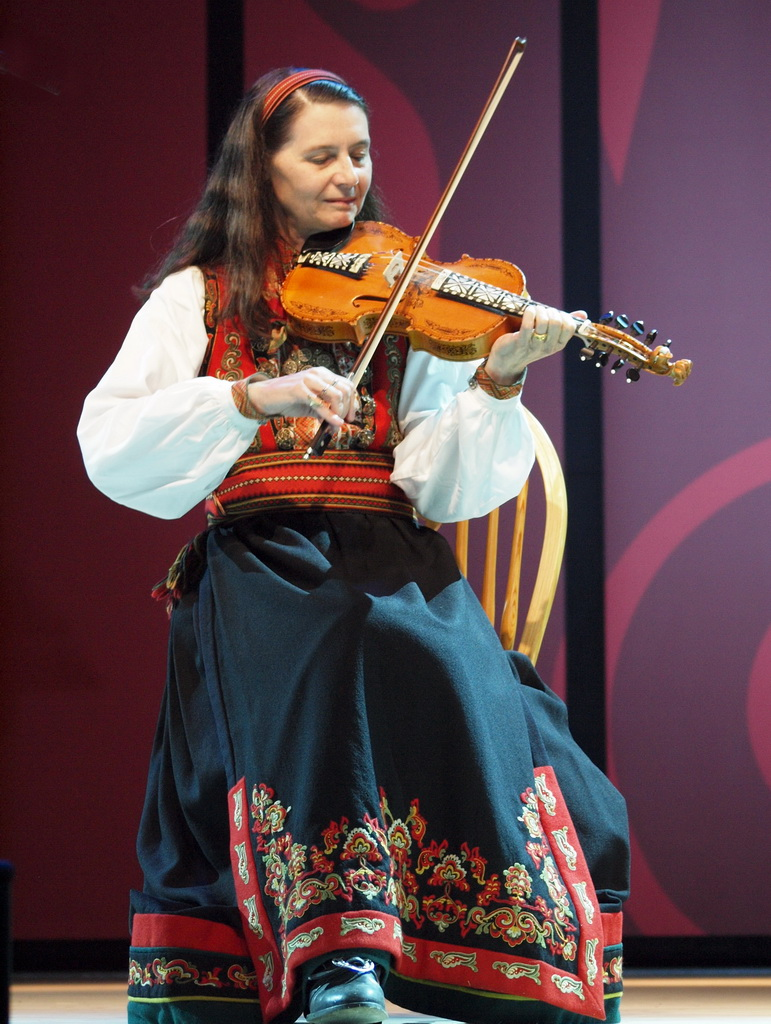
Loretta A. Kelley, winner of class D, National Hardanger Fiddle Contest 2011 in Seljord, Telemark county, Norway.

Loretta A. Kelley is an American Hardanger fiddle player. She is President of The Hardanger Fiddle Association of America, and is described by her recording company as the foremost Hardanger fiddle player in the U.S.

Recently , there has been a substantial revival of the Hardanger fiddle tradition in the U.S. Today there are more than 150 active players, and the number is growing. Kelley has made a considerable number of study travels and performances in Norway, where she is well known in folk music and folk dance circles. She is one of the core members of Scandia DC, a Scandinavian Folk Dance Group serving the Washington D.C. metropolitan area.

== Discography ==
- Loretta A. Kelley, Amerikaspel CD - disc ACCD-9603, Azalea City Recordings 1996.

The album contains 20 Norwegian folk tunes and folk dances learned by listening, playing and singing in authentic Norwegian style with American performers on Norwegian instruments.
