= Låtfiol =

Form of violin for Swedish folk musicians

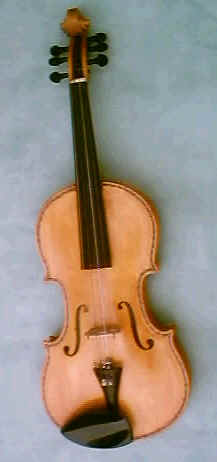

Låtfiol (Swedish pronunciation: [ˈlɔːtfɪˌuːl]) is a variety of violin developed in the 1980s when Swedish folk musicians became more interested in a version of the instrument with sympathetic strings and were trying to find a Swedish equivalent to the Norwegian hardanger fiddle.

The Norwegian violin maker Kåre Leonard Knutsen built a number of instruments for Swedish musicians, some were copies of older instruments with 8 sympathetic strings in Swedish museums (i.e. double-deckers), but even more of Knutsen's instruments were provided with two sympathetic strings based on oral sources that such things would have occurred in Sweden in the past. It is in particular violins with two resonant strings that have been called låtfiol by some, but the term is far from widespread. The oral sources for the existence of violins with two sympathetic strings have not been verified, however, more and more double-deckers have appeared, even those with less than 8 sympathetic strings but in those cases either 6 or 4 sympathetic strings. There are written sources about Swedish violins with sympathetic strings but all those instruments have more than two sympathetic strings.

The word låtfiol translates to "tune fiddle"; however, the term is also used by Swedish musicians to refer to a standard fiddle (violin) when used for performing music, rather than providing music for dancers. According to Lennart Carlsson, handcrafted låtfiols with up to eight sympathetic strings were fairly common prior to and during 18th-century Sweden, however there are no evidence that those instruments were called Låtfiol and they are very seldom called that today. The use of sympathetic strings makes the låtfiol more akin to the Norwegian national instrument, the hardingfele, also known as the Hardanger fiddle. Låtfiol was a concept developed in cooperation with the Norwegian violin maker Kåre Leonard Knudsen but there are no historical connections between preserved Swedish fiddles with sympathetic strings and the hardingfele even though the similarity in concept and construction suggests that. A låtfiol typically resemble standard violins, visually, rather than Hardanger fiddles or preserved Swedish fiddles with sympathetic strings. A låtfiol typically has a standard violin scroll rather than a carved lion head which is most common on hardanger fiddles and Swedish double-deckers.

The use of sympathetic strings create extra resonance, atmosphere and volume while playing and is also used on Swedish keyed fiddles, such as the nyckelharpa and the related silverbasharpa. The sympathetic strings are typically longer than the melody strings, and are connected to the furthest pegs atop the scroll, while they are strung underneath a heightened fingerboard, through a specialised bridge, and connected to small, modified fine-tuners (or hooks) on the tailpiece. The latter is a difference from the Swedish double-decker where the sympathetic strings are attached to small metal pins on the ribs next to the end pin, and is probably explained by the fact that the first maker of a Låtfiol was a Norwegian luthier who earlier built hardanger fiddles (where the sympathetic strings are always attached to the tailpiece).

== See also ==
- Hardanger fiddle
- Nyckelharpa
- Vioara cu goarnă
- Kontra
- Rabeca
- Viola d'amore
- Swedish Double-decker, a Swedish fiddle with 4–8 sympathetic strings
