= Robert Larsen =

Robert Larson may refer to:

- Robert Larsen (American football) (1931–2019), American football coach and college athletics administrator
- Robert Larsen (boxer) (1898–1981), Danish boxer
- Robert "Bud" Larsen (born 1942), American fiddle maker
- Bob Larsen (born 1939), track and field athletics coach

== See also ==
- Robert Larson (disambiguation)
