= Robert "Bud" Larsen =

American craftsman and maker of Hardanger fiddles

Robert "Bud" Larsen with a Hardanger fiddle he has made in the Gunnar Gunnarsson Helland style.

Robert "Bud" Larsen (born 1942) is an American craftsman and maker of Hardanger fiddles. His making of Hardanger fiddles is a side activity.

Larsen's father played violin and Hardanger fiddle. He had emigrated from Førde Municipality in Sunnfjord, Norway and lived for many years in Fargo, North Dakota.

Robert Larsen, at the age of 14, apprenticed to the Norwegian-American violin maker Gunnar Gunnarsson Helland as a repairman and a fiddle maker in Fargo from 1957 to 1965.

== See also ==
- The Helland fiddle maker family
- Hardingfele
