= Arne Bjørndal =

Norwegian musician (1882–1965)

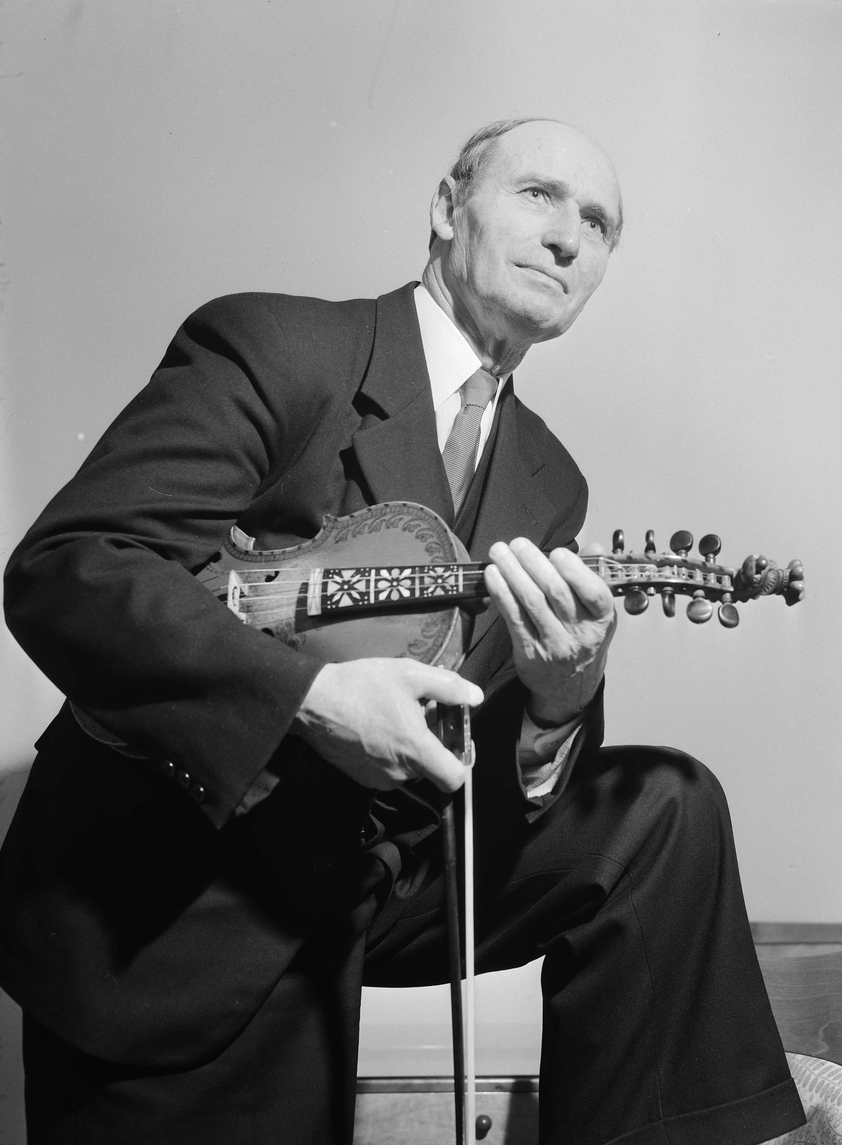
- Born: 11 February 1882; Hosanger Municipality, Norway
- Died: 11 January 1965 (aged 82); Bergen, Norway
- Occupations: Hardingfele fiddler, composer and folklorist
- Awards: Order of St. Olav (1954)

Arne Bjørndal (11 February 1882 – 11 January 1965) was a Norwegian hardingfele fiddler, composer and folklorist.

== Personal life ==
Bjørndal was born in Hosanger Municipality as the son of Peder Monsen Bjørndal and Kari Knutsdotter Nordås. He was married to Brita Rongved from 1910 to 1924, and to Anna Strømmen from 1929. He died in Bergen in 1965.

== Career ==
Bjørndal started playing the fiddle as a young boy, and later studied with fiddler Ola Mosafinn, while he learned theory by W. Gomnæs, Borghild Holmsen and J. Thorkildsen. He made his concert debut in Kristiania in February 1908. From 1911 he received a scholarship for collecting traditional music. He wrote down thousands of traditional Norwegian folk melodies, which have later been stored at the University of Bergen.

He played in more than six hundred weddings, gave more than 1,000 concerts, and had success in folk music contests. Among his compositions is music to Torvald Tu's "Kjærlege par", music to Olav Gullvåg's play Storborgbrudlaupet (together with Johan Ludwig Mowinckel). He composed several dance melodies, including "På Ulrikkens topp", and the waltz "Sumarkveld til fjells". Among his publications are Norske Slåttar (from 1907 and onwards), Gamle slåttar, a biography of fiddler Ola Mosafinn and a book on Ole Bull. He wrote articles on Myllarguten and Edvard Grieg, and co-wrote the book – og fela ho lét with Brynjulf Alver, published in 1966, after his death. He was a music critic for the newspaper Gula Tidend from 1917 to 1940, and chaired the Norwegian National Association for Traditional Music and Dance from 1923 to 1936.

He was decorated as a Knight, First Class of the Royal Norwegian Order of St. Olav in 1954. A relief of Bjørndal, made by sculptor Sofus Madsen, was unveiled in 1973.
