= Ola Mosafinn =

Norwegian Hardanger fiddle player and composer

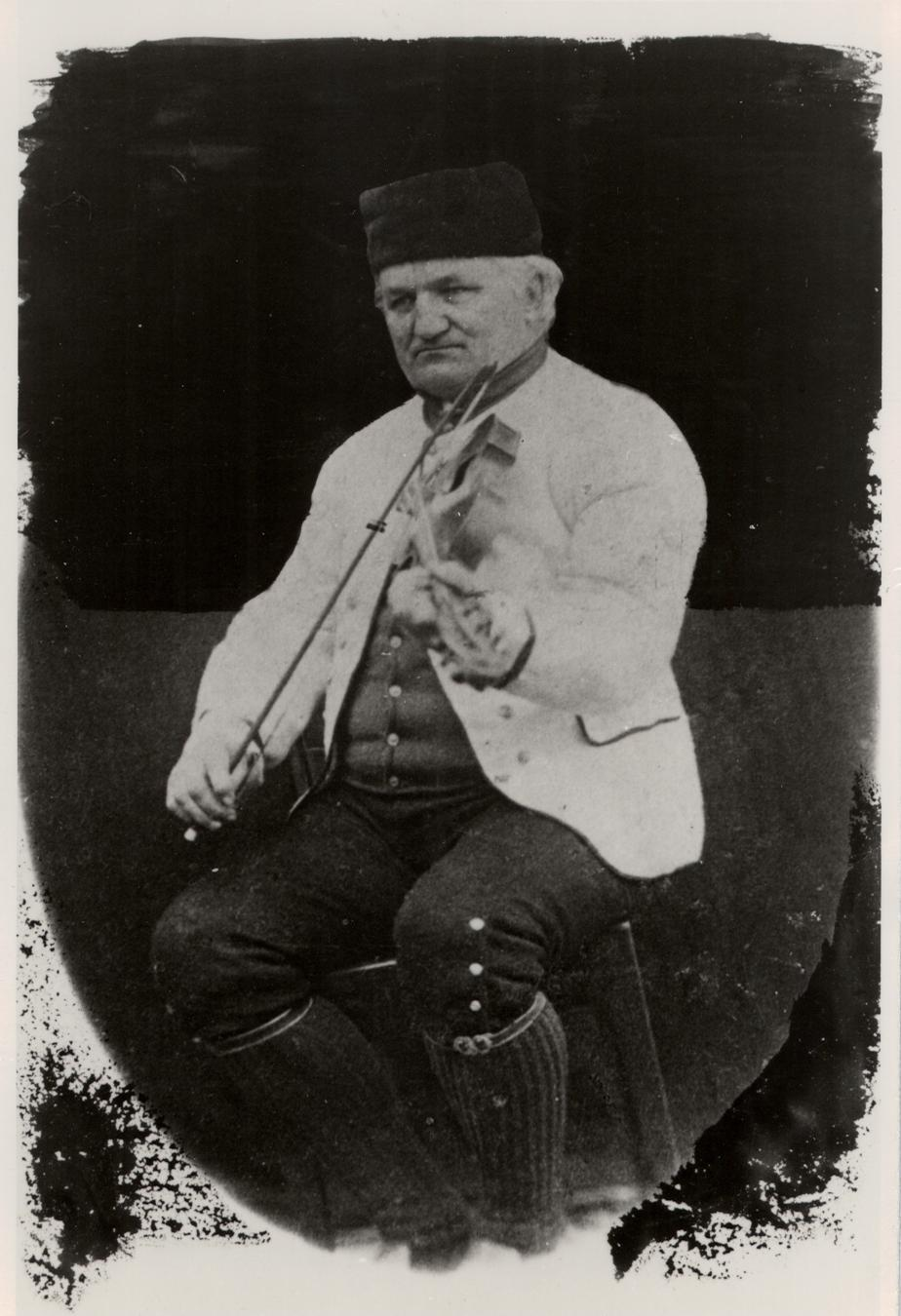
Ola Mosafinn

Ola Mosafinn (14 July 1828 – 28 December 1912) was a Norwegian Hardanger fiddle player and composer. Mosafinn is regarded among the more important fiddlers in Norway in the late 19th century.

Ola Sjursson was born in Voss in Hordaland County, Norway. He was the youngest of five children born to Sjurd Brynjulvsson Liland (1792–1866) and Ingebjørg Klausdotter Mosafinn (1790–1852). He was raised on the Mosafinn farm from which he took has last name. After graduation in 1843 he was first employed as a school teacher, but was also on demand at weddings and parties.

He later went to Hardanger, where he soon came to thrive. In the summer of 1872, crown prince and future King Oscar II of Sweden, made a trip to the west coast of Norway and Ola Mosafinn was invited to perform. Later that summer, Mosafinn met famed Norwegian violinist and composer Ole Bull, who gave the fiddler praise. During the summer of 1879, Norwegian composer Edvard Grieg visited Voss. Grieg sent for Mosafinn who performed at his birthday celebration. He became well known in Norway and made two tours in the United States. In 1890 and 1891, Mosafinn traveled to the United States after being invited several times. He played in Chicago and later in Minneapolis, in addition to some smaller towns.

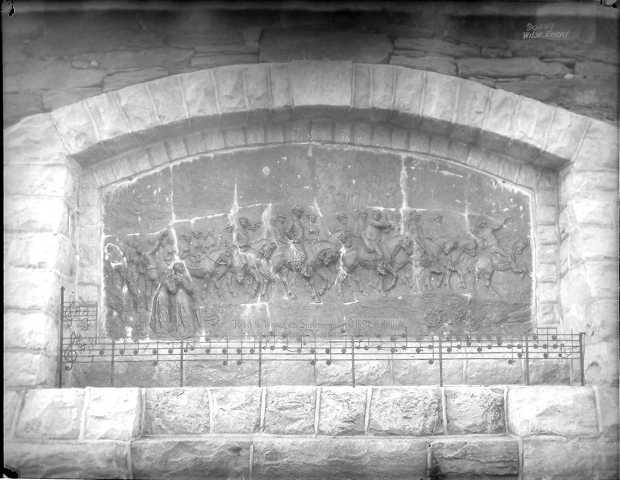
Memorial to Mosafinn in Voss

Only two compositions are known to have been written by Mosafinn, one of which is Gjætarlokketonar frå Voss. In 1887, his portrait was painted by Norwegian artist Lars Osa. In 1921, a memorial to Ola Mosafinn was erected in Voss Municipality. The monument is made by Norwegian sculptor Nils Bergslien. A biography of Mosafinn was written by his former apprentice Arne Bjørndal and published in 1922.

== Other sources ==
- Bjørndal, Arne (1922). Ola Mosafinn. Bergen.
