= John Gunnarsson Helland =

Norwegian Hardanger fiddle maker

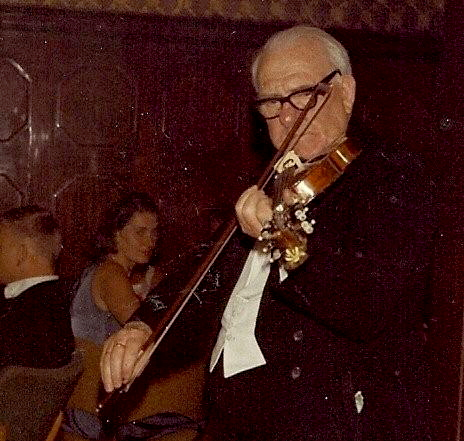
John G Helland

Jon Gunnarsson Helland (1897–1977) was a Norwegian Hardanger fiddle maker from Bø Municipality in Telemark county, Norway.

John Gunnarson Helland, was the fourth of the five Gunnar Olavsson Helland sons. He began work in his father's workshop and then went to Notodden, Telemark, where he made some of his best fiddles.

From 1917 to 1927, he travelled in Sweden and Germany. He later operated a workshop for fiddles and violins and a music shop in Skien.

== See also ==
- Helland (fiddle makers)
