= Gunleik Jonsson Helland =

Norwegian Hardanger fiddle maker (1828-1863)

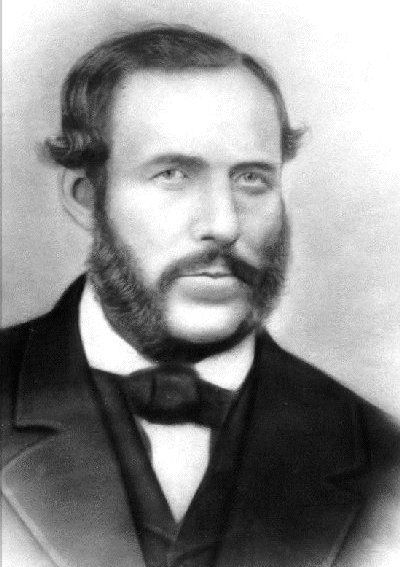
Gunleik Jonsson Helland

Gunleik "Gullik" Jonsson Helland (1828–1863) was a Norwegian Hardanger fiddle maker from Bø in Telemark, Norway.

Gunleik (the name was written both ways) Helland, son of the first fiddle maker at Helland cotters farm, worked several years in his father's workshop until he left Bø and went to Horten, Norway and became a steam machine engineer in the Navy.

He died 1863 in the North Atlantic when his ship D/S Rjukan, from Bugge's shipowners in Bergen, Norway sank south of Iceland.

== See also ==
- The Helland fiddle maker family
