= Knut Eilevsson Steintjønndalen =

Norwegian Hardanger fiddle maker

Knut Eilevsson Steintjønndalen (c. 1850 – December 2, 1902) was a Norwegian Hardanger fiddle maker from Bø in Telemark, Norway.

Knut Eilevsson Steintjønndalen continued the Steintjønndal tradition when his brother Jon Eilevsson Steintjønndalen left. He married and bought the Langkås farm in the Folkestad neighbourhood, and he founded a workshop there.

He experimented with making the tone more powerful by increasing the thickness of the soundboard and bottom. This feature created quite a demand for his fiddles. However, his greatest reputation came from the exquisite ornamentation on his instruments. Knut used a river pearl mussels from the river in Bø to decorate both the grip board and the tailpiece. Both the varnishing and the rose decorations had not been seen before or since.

At the end of the 1800s he was considered the leading violin maker. The musicians that he created instruments for included Nils Tjoflot. He died at age 57.

== See also ==
- The Helland fiddle maker family
