= Kivledalen =

Valley in Telemark, Norway

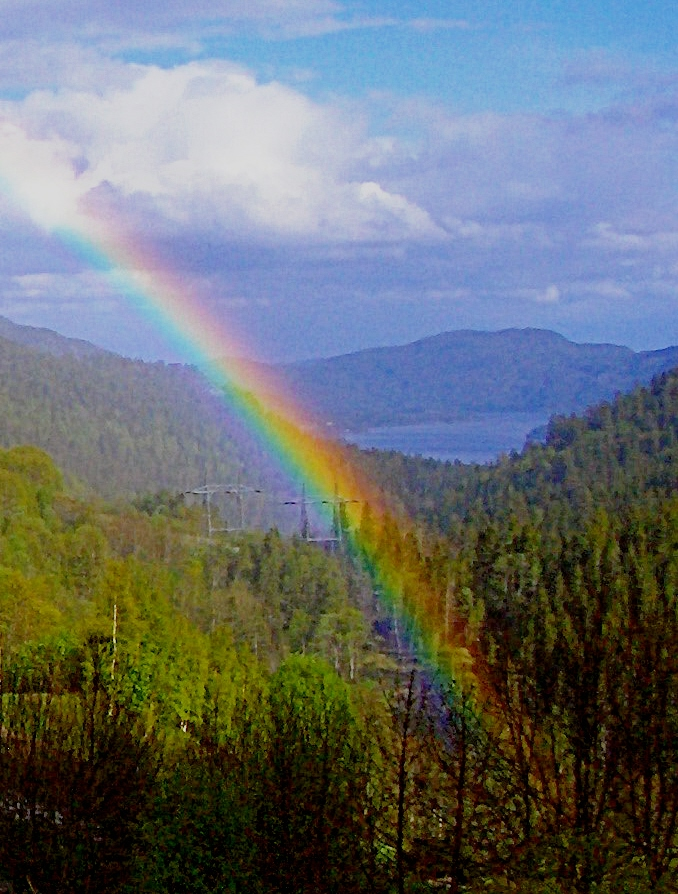
- View of the valley
- Length: 3 kilometres (1.9 mi)

Geology
- Type: River valley

Geography
- Location: Telemark, Norway
- Population centers: Seljord
- Coordinates: 59.4989°N 8.5949°E
- River: Kivleåi river

Location
- Interactive map of Kivledalen

Kivledalen is a valley in Seljord Municipality in Telemark county, Norway. The valley lies between the Skorve and Hattefjell mountains, immediately to the northwest of the village of Seljord.

== History ==
The first known settlement in the valley was established in the 16th century. Kivledal is mentioned in several Norse sagas and Norwegian rural legends, the best known being the legend of Kivlemøyane. According to the legend, a church stood at Nystaulækrun in the medieval period.

== Recreation ==
Kivledal is known as a good recreation place for the Seljord region. Hiking to the 1,370-metre (4,490 ft) tall mountain Gøysen via Listaul and hiking to the 1,360-metre (4,460 ft) tall mountain Nordnibba via Skrovestaul are both popular. In the winter, a fit skier can travel to the lake Lomma and as far as the Mandal valley, about 15 kilometres (9.3 mi) to the northwest.
