= Kari Buen =

Norwegian sculptor (1938–2025)

Kari Buen (23 January 1938 – 15 November 2025) was a Norwegian sculptor.

== Life and career ==
Buen was born in Kongsberg on 23 January 1938. She belonged to the artist family Buen from Jondalen, and was the daughter of the fiddler Anders A. Buen and the traditional musician Margit Buen. Kari Buen was the sister of the musicians Hauk Buen, Knut Buen and Agnes Buen Garnås. She is particularly known for her work with reliefs, sculptures, wood carving work and drawings.

She studied at the Art School in Trondheim under Karl Johan Flåthen 1958–1960, at the Norwegian National Academy of Fine Arts in Oslo under Per Palle Storm and Roar Wold 1963–66 and 1973–74, and at Rauland Academy under Knut Skinnarland 1978 to 1979. Buen debuted at the Autumn Exhibition in Oslo in 1960.

Buen died on 15 November 2025, at the age of 87.
