= Myrkgrav =

Norwegian metal band

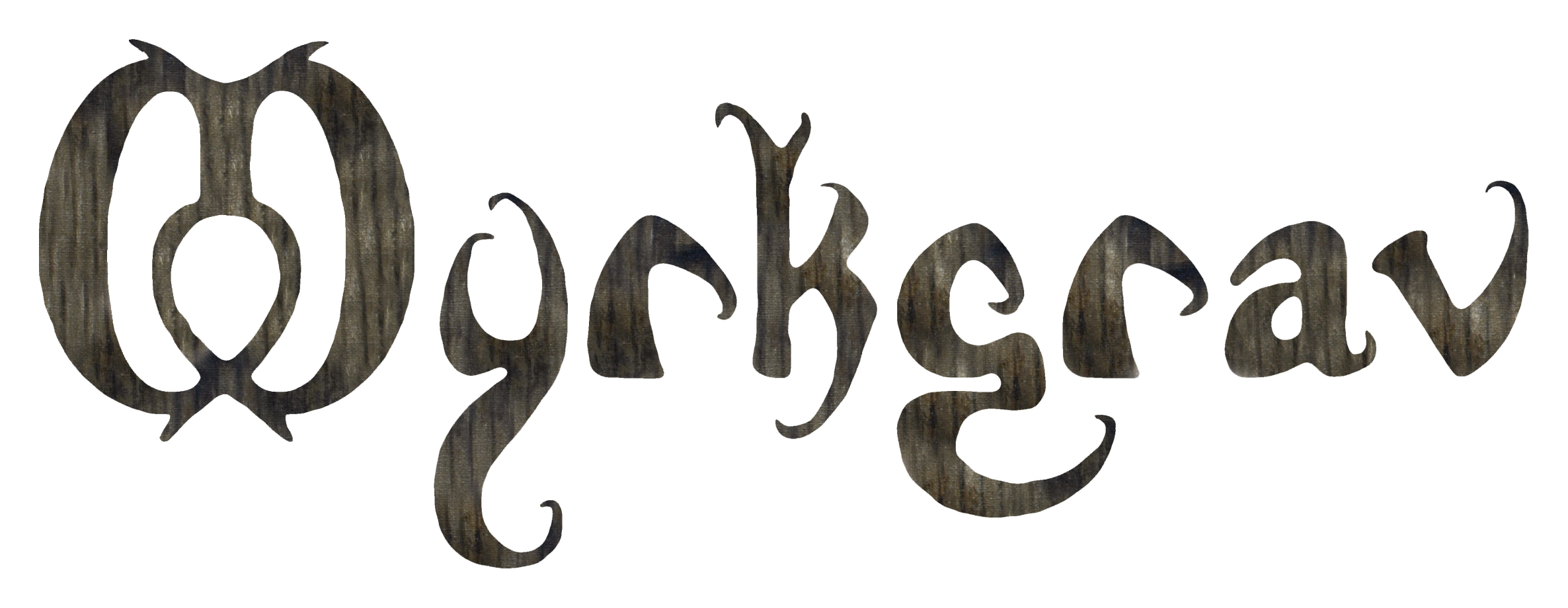

Background information
- Origin: Ringerike, Norway
- Genres: Folk metal; Viking metal; black metal
- Years active: 2003–present
- Label: DGF
- Members: Lars Jensen

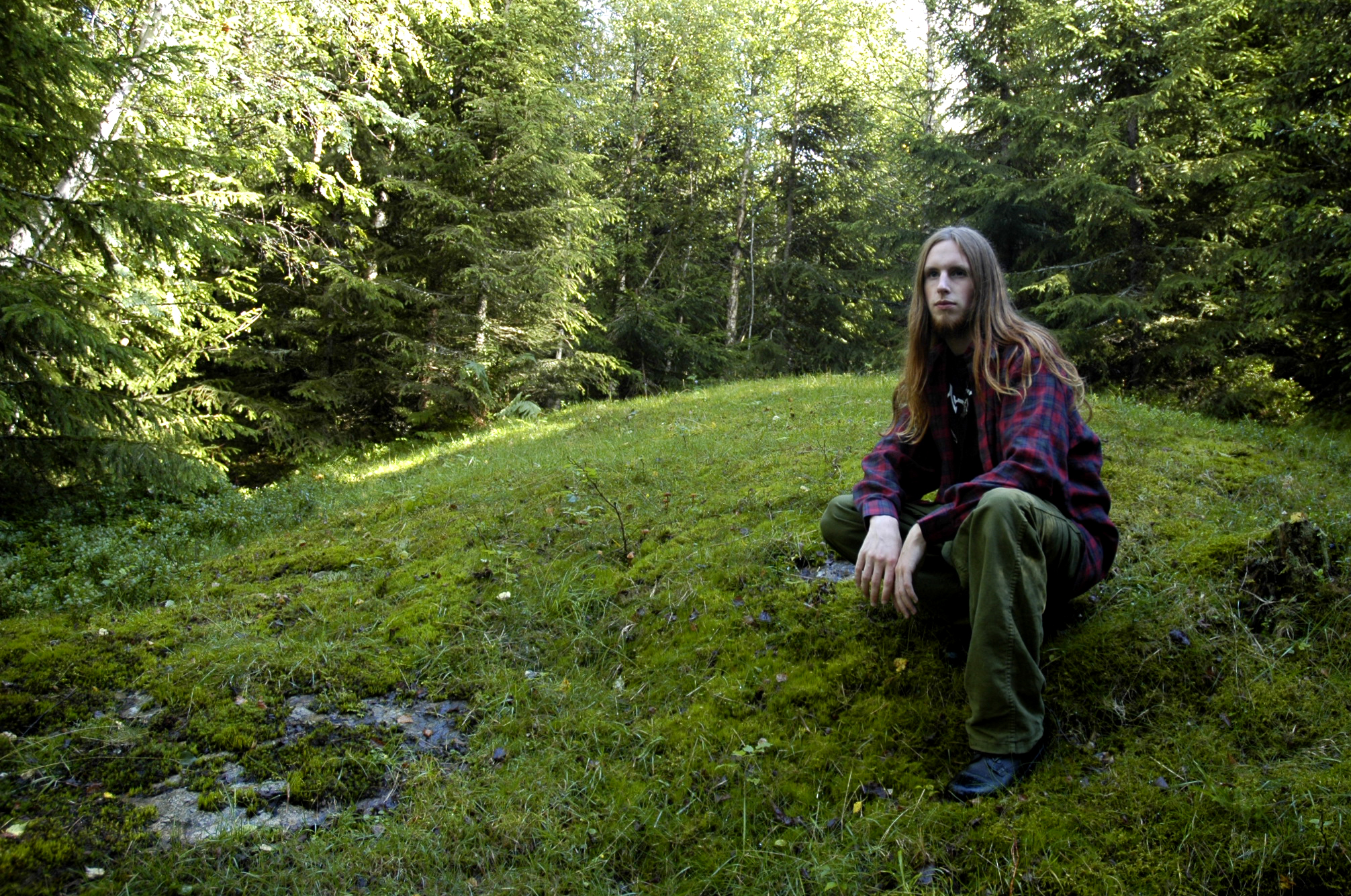
Lars Jensen in 2007

Myrkgrav is a Norwegian blackened folk metal project created by Lars Jensen in 2003. The following year, he released the demo Fra fjellheimen kaller... His debut studio album, Trollskau, skrømt og kølabrenning, was issued in October 2006. The project's lyrics deal with local history, legends, and folklore from Ringerike, Lommedalen, and Hole, from the 17th and 19th centuries. The songs are sung in a local Norwegian dialect.

== Myrkgrav ==
- Lars Jensen – vocals, guitars, bass guitar, keyboards, drums, folk instruments

=== Session musicians ===
- Stine Ross Idsø – hardanger fiddle (2008–present)
- Olav Mjelva – hardanger fiddle (2008–present)

=== Guest musicians ===
- Aleksandra Rajković – keyboards
- Erlend Antonsen – bass guitar
- Espen Hammer – bass guitarist on Trollskau, skrømt og kølabrenning
- Benita Eriksdatter – vocals on "Gygra og St. Olav"
- Sindre Nedland – clean vocals on Trollskau, skrømt og kølabrenning

== Discography ==
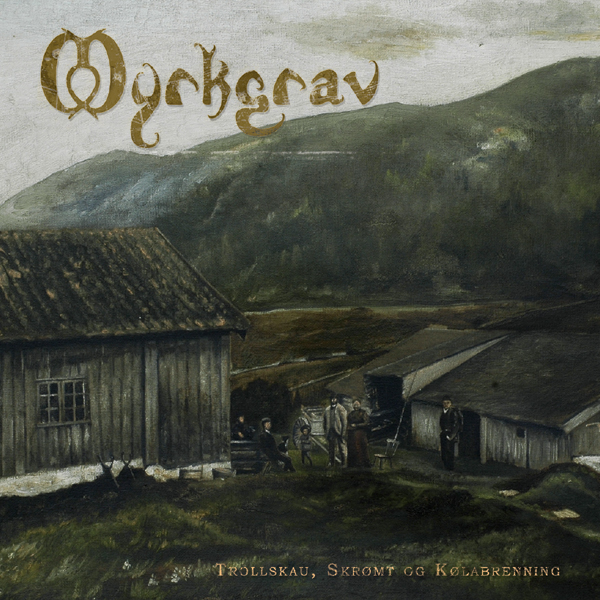
Album art for Trollskau, skrømt og kølabrenning

- Fra fjellheimen kaller... (demo) (2004)
- Trollskau, skrømt og kølabrenning (2006)
- Sjuguttmyra / Ferden går videre (split release with Voluspaa) (2011)
- Sjuguttmyra (EP) (2013)
- Takk og farvel; tida er blitt ei annen (2016)
