= Olav Gunnarsson Helland =

Norwegian Hardanger fiddle maker

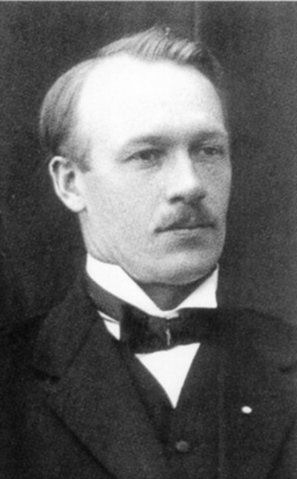

Olav Gunnarsson Helland (25 August 1875 – 30 April 1946) was a Norwegian Hardanger fiddle maker from Bø Municipality in Telemark county, Norway.

He was the eldest of Gunnar Olavsson Helland's five sons, four of whom became violin makers. He showed great talent even in his younger days and worked with his father for many years.

In 1896 he settled in Notodden, Telemark, as violin maker and continued the Helland tradition of winning prizes and medals for his work. Many consider him as the greatest of his kind in the twentieth century.

== See also ==
- The Helland fiddle maker family
