= Robert Larson =

Robert Larson may refer to:

- Robert L. Larson (1898–1986), Justice of the Iowa Supreme Court
- Robert J. Larson (born 1932), a former member of the Wisconsin State Assembly

== See also ==
- Robert Larsen (disambiguation)
- Robert Larsson (1967–2018), Swedish professional ice hockey player
