= Gunnar Olavsson Helland =

Norwegian Hardanger fiddle maker

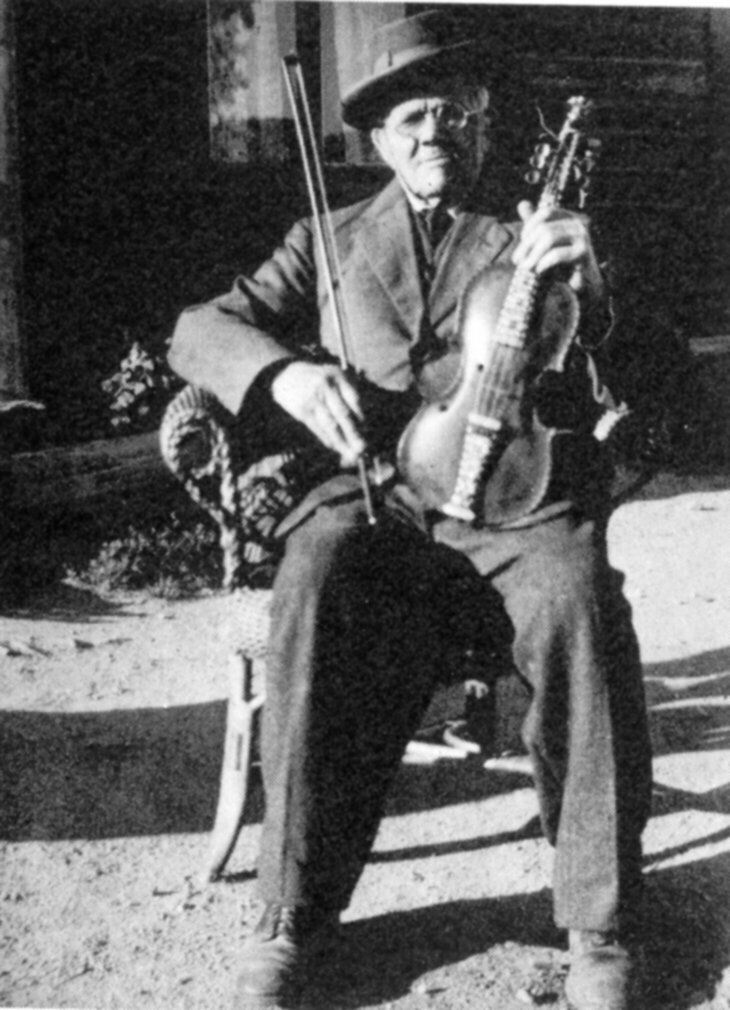
Gunnar Olavsson Helland

Gunnar Olavsson Helland (July 15, 1852 – 1938) was a Norwegian Hardanger fiddle (hardingfele) maker from Bø in Telemark, Norway.

== Biography ==
Gunnar Olavsson Haugen was a brother-in-law of Knut Eriksson Helland who was married to his sister, Liv Olavsdatter Haugen (1849-1883). In 1871, Gunnar Haugen married the twin sister of Knut Helland, Gunnhild Eriksdatter Helland (1851–1907). Gunnar and Gunnhild were the parents of:

- Olav Gunnarsson Helland (1875–1946)
- Knut Gunnarsson Helland (1880–1920)
- Gunnar Gunnarsson Helland (1889–1976)
- John Gunnarsson Helland (1897–1977)

Following his marriage to Gunnhild, Gunnar Olavsson Haugen re-located to Helland and shortly after began learning the art of making violins from his brother-in-law. He became a successful violin maker, winning prizes and medals both in Norway and abroad. When Knut Helland died in 1880, Gunnar took over both the family farm and the fiddle workshop, at which time he adopted the surname Helland. He had the farm for 26 years and then bought a larger farm below Bø Church (Bø kyrkjelyd), now the site of the trade and research center Hellandtunet Forsknings og Næringssenter.

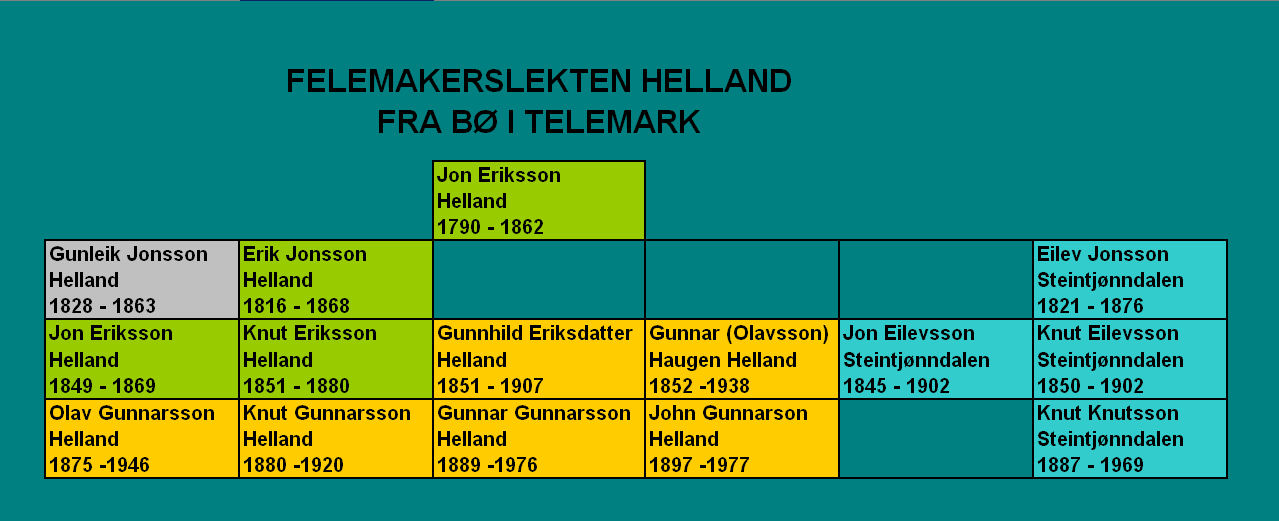
The Helland fiddle maker family

== See also ==
- The Helland fiddle maker family
- Helland (fiddle makers)

== Footnotes ==
- "Bø-Soga, 1 Kultursoga bind 1" (Bø Lokalhistorie).
- "Bø-Soga, 2 Gards og ættesoge, bind 4" (Bø Lokalhistorie, gårds- og slektshistorie).
- "Soga om fela", by Steinar Kyvik, Fonna 1946.
- "Felemakerslekten Helland", by John Gunnarson Helland, private, typed paper.
- "Hardingfele i fire slektledd", Article, interview in Bergens Arbeiderblad 5 October 1963, by Åsmund Nyhammer
- "Bøherad, hardingfelas Cremona" in "Leik og Dans" 1988 pp. 57–71, by Asbjørn Storesund, Halvard Kaasa, editor.
- "Morgenbladet", Christiania, Thursday 15 July 1852
