= Nils Bergslien =

Norwegian illustrator, painter, sculptor

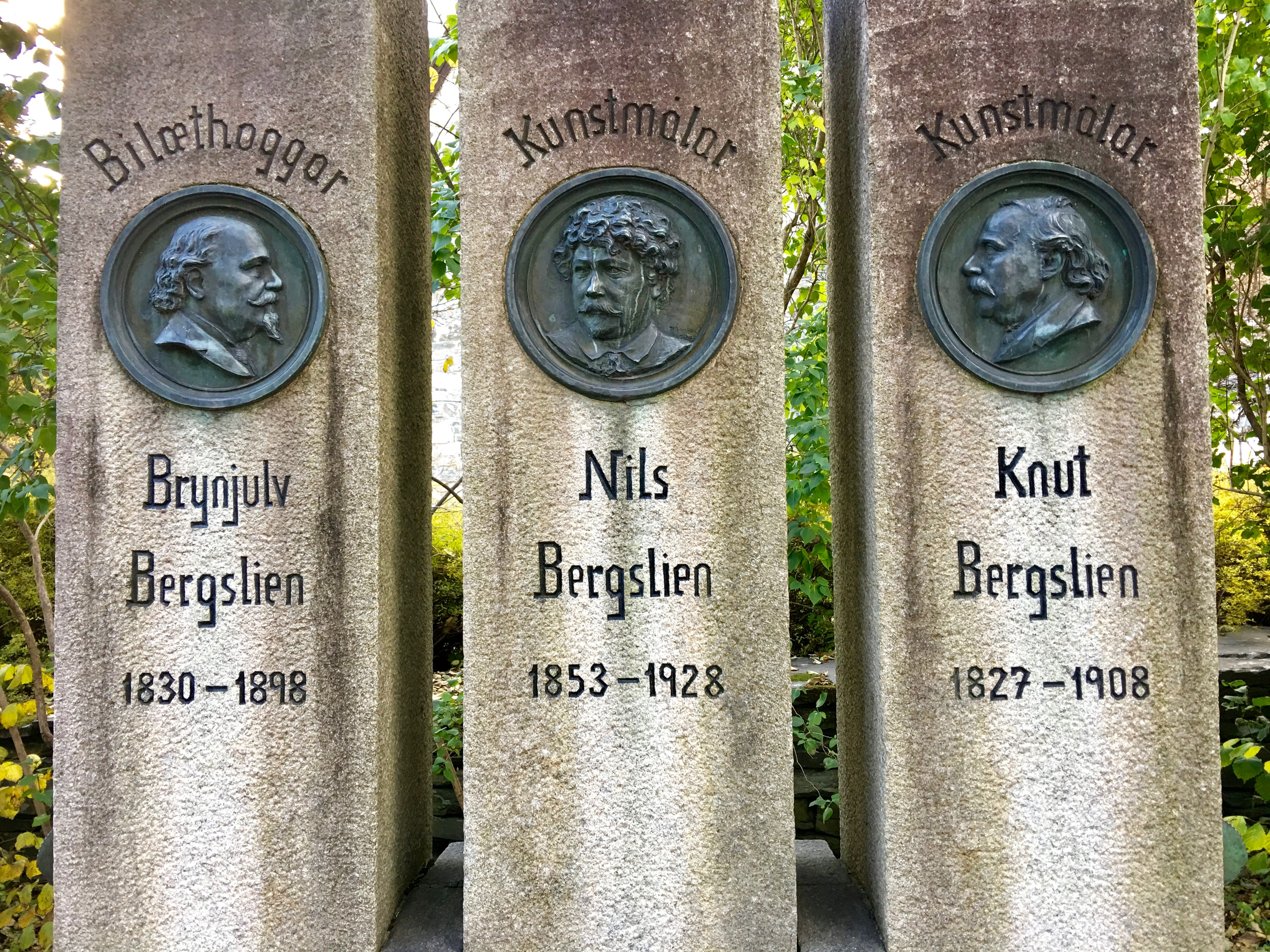
Monument to Nils Bergslien, and his uncles Brynjulf and Knud Bergslien at Bergslien Park in Voss

Nils Nilsen Bergslien (26 February 1853 – 18 December 1928) was a Norwegian illustrator, painter and sculptor. Nils Berglien was inspired by the legends, the history of Norway and the west Norwegian mountain landscape. He was known for his national-romantic depictions of folk life and motifs from fairy tales and legends.

== Personal life ==
Bergslien was born in Voss Municipality in Søndre Bergenhus county, Norway. He was the son of Nils Larsen Bergslien and Sigvor Nilsdatter. His uncles were painter and artist Knud Bergslien and sculptor Brynjulf Bergslien. He was married to Johanna Jacobsdatter Møkletun (1853–1921). The couple settled in Eidfjord. He died in Eidfjord in 1928.

== Career ==
Nils Bergslien was educated by his uncle Knud Bergslien and landscape painter Morten Müller (1828–1911). He attended Morten Müller's art school in Kristiania from 1871 to 1872, 1873 and accompanied his uncle on a study trip to Germany and Austria. From 1876 to 1879, he studied at the Academy of Fine Arts, Munich under Otto Seitz (1846–1912). During 1874 or 1875, he undertook a study tour in Telemark with Gerhard Munthe and 1880, he traveled with the sculptor Axel Ender and Danish poet Holger Drachmann over the Hardangervidda mountain plateau.

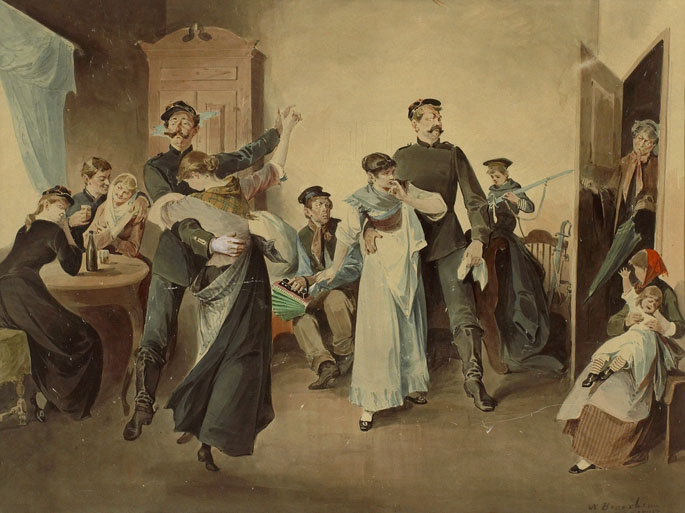
The Discovered Dance (1895)

Nils Bergslien was known for his illustrations of folk life, his puck pictures, and for motives from legends and fairytales. His series Nissealbum was published in 1886. He decorated several hotel rooms and churches. He made caricature illustrations and designed the title vignette of the satirical magazine Vikingen. He designed a memorial of fiddler Ola Mosafinn, the bronze relief Ridande Vossabrudlaup.

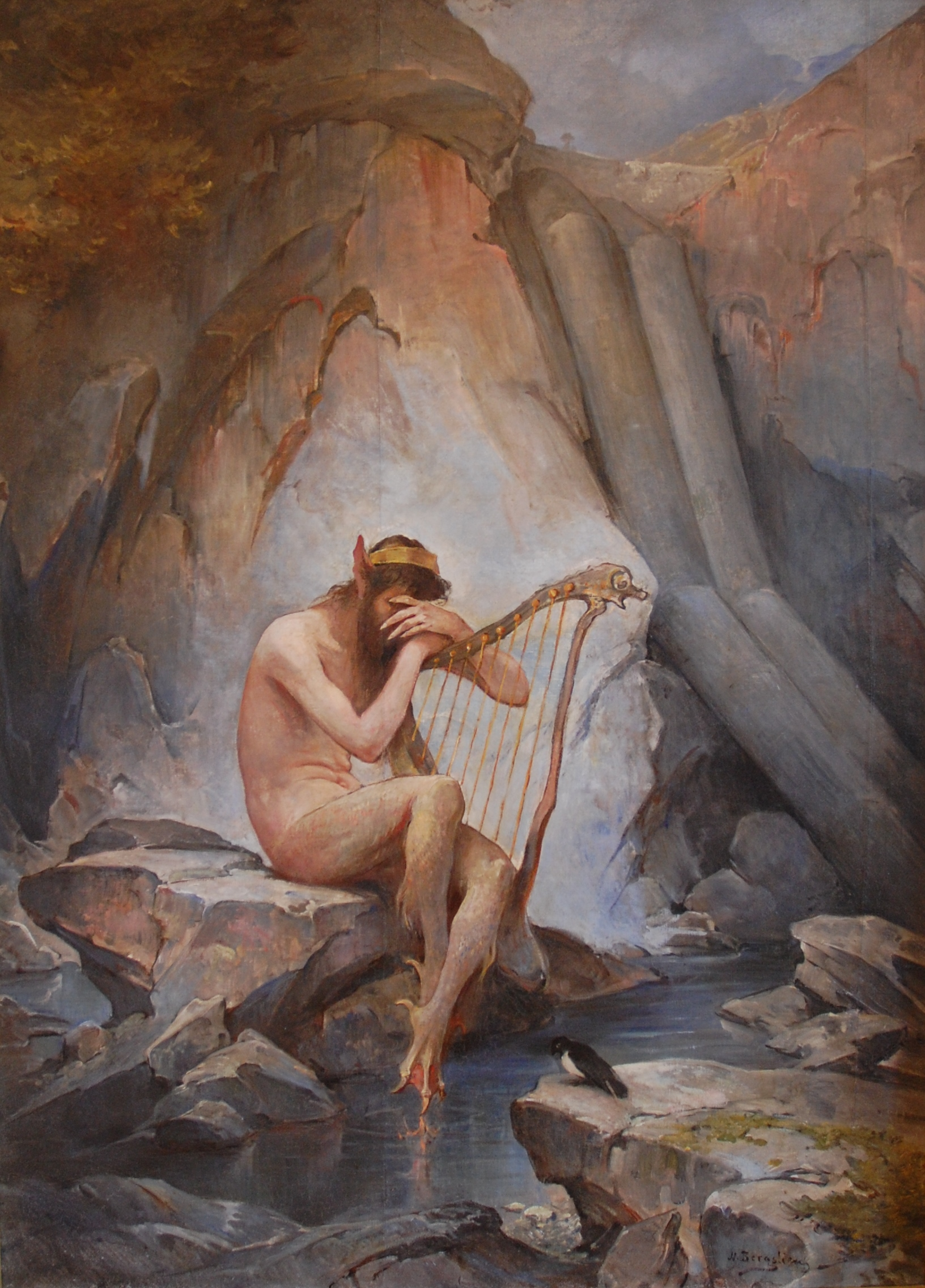
Fossegrimen (1912) Tyssedal Hotel

Over the years Bergslien was given a number of commissions. In 1886, he created the decorations for the tourist ship Britannia; from 1899 to 1900 he decorated several rooms in the Hotel Café Boulevard Norway and Bergen (destroyed by fire 1916) and in the Tyssedal Hotel at Odda Municipality and later he made the national romantic decorations for the dining room in the Hotel Vøringfoss in Eidfjord Municipality.

At the Bergslien Park in Vossavangen are monuments honoring the three Bergslien artists, Brynjulf, Knud and Nils. The Nils Bergslien Gallery (Galleri Nils Bergslien) was established by Eidfjord Municipality which owns and operates the gallery. It contains original work by Nils Berglien.

== Other sources ==
- Warberg, Thor (2008) Bergslien-målarane : folkeliv i fargar (Førde : Selja forl.) ISBN 9788291722894
