= Agnes Buen Garnås =

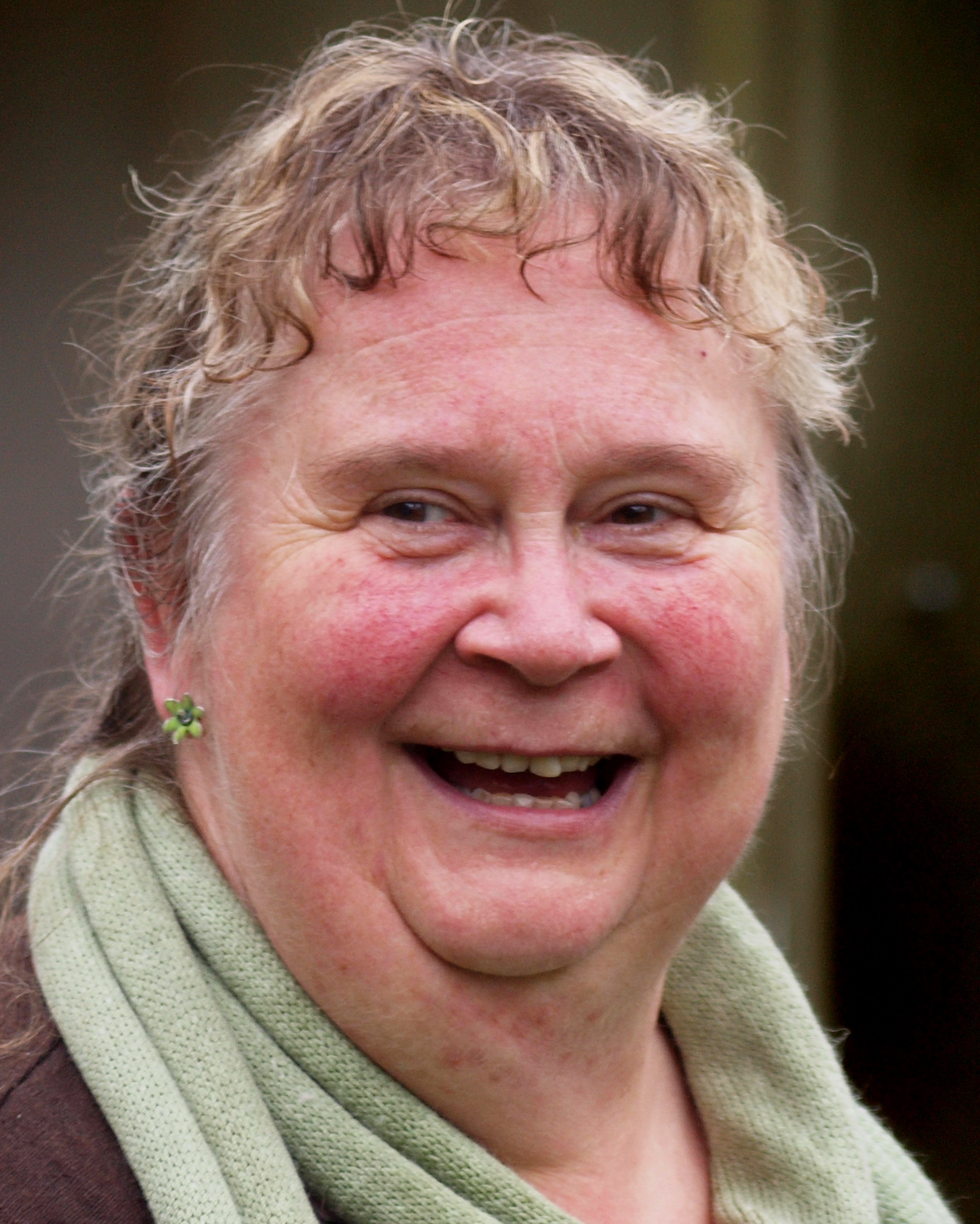
- Buen Garnås in 2011

Background information
- Born: Agnes Buen; 23 October 1946; Kongsberg, Norway
- Origin: Telemark, Norway
- Died: 12 November 2024 (aged 78) Notodden, Norway
- Genres: Folk
- Occupation: Singer
- Website: www.agnesbuen.no

Agnes Buen Garnås (23 October 1946 – 12 November 2024) was a Norwegian folk singer from the county of Telemark. She came from a famous musical family from Jondalen in Gransherad Municipality (now in Kongsberg Municipality), and was known particularly for her singing of ancient unaccompanied Norwegian ballads, as well as her updated arrangements of these songs in collaboration with the Norwegian saxophonist Jan Garbarek on the ECM album Rosensfole.

From 1975 to 1977, she studied at the Telemark University College.

Other family members who are well known as traditional musicians include her brothers, Hauk Buen and Knut Buen, and her son Per Anders Buen Garnås.

Buen Garnås died in Notodden on 12 November 2024, at the age of 78.

== Discography ==
- Det spelar og syng i familien Buen, 1975
- Når klokkune gjeve dur, 1976, 2002
- Folk Music of Norway, 1977
- Nordafjølls, 1983
- På gamle tufter, with Sondre Bratland, Kåre Nordstoga, Guttorm *Guttormsen, Knut Buen, Halvor Håkanes, Warren Carlstrøm and Finn Kvalem, 1985
- Jul med Rupesekken, 1985
- Stem våre understrenger, with Knut Buens, 1988
- Draumkvedet, with Inger Lise Ulsrud and Knut Buen, 1989
- Tusseliten og Trippeliti, with Finn Kvalem, Guttorm Guttormsen, Knut Buen and Olav Snortheim, 1989
- Rosensfole, with Jan Garbarek, 1989
- Høgdepunkt frå Landskappleiken, 1994
- Med blanke ark, 1994
- Attersyn, with Knut Buen, 1995
- Stev og slått, with Knut Buen, 1996
- Det syng, with Anne Marit Jacobsen, Halvor Håkanes, Eli Storbekken and *Sinikka Langeland, 1997
- Langt inn i hugheimen, with Knut Buen, 1997
- Ljos og skugge, with Knut Buen, 1998
- Soltreet, 2002
- Han rider den mørke natt, 2002

With Jan Garbarek

- Rosensfole (ECM, 1989)
- Twelve Moons (ECM, 1992)

Awards
Preceded by Sigmund Groven	Recipient of the Gammleng-prisen Open class 1997	Succeeded by Karl Seglem
Preceded by Jan Garbarek	Recipient of the Norsk kulturråds ærespris 2005	Succeeded by Bruno Oldani
