= Erik Jonsson Helland =

Norwegian Hardanger fiddle maker

Erik Jonsson Helland (1816–1868) was a Norwegian Hardanger fiddle maker.

Erik Jonsson Helland was the eldest son of the Hardanger fiddle maker Jon Eriksson Helland from Bø in Telemark, Norway. Around 1830, he began to specialize in making Hardanger fiddles and to experiment in his father's workshop with new models in order to obtain a more powerful tone without losing the softness of the instrument. This led to a broader instrument, with a fuller outline and a lower vault, which is now the more common style. In the 1850s, he gained national attention and in 1861 was awarded a national scholarship to study with the violin makers, Enger & Son in Copenhagen.

== See also ==
- The Helland fiddle maker family
- Jon Eriksson Helland II

== Related Reading ==
- Aksdal, Bjørn (2009) Hardingfela felemakere og instrumentets utvikling (Trondheim: Tapir Akademisk Forlag) ISBN 978-82-519-2402-3
