= Gunnar Gunnarsson Helland =

Norwegian-American Hardanger fiddle maker

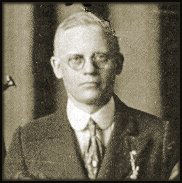
Gunnar Gunnarsson Helland

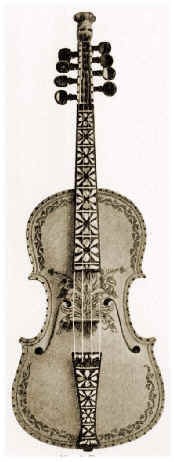
Hardanger fiddle built by Gunnar Gunnarsson Helland. From a brochure for Helland Brothers

Gunnar Gunnarsson Helland (January 26, 1885 – April 20, 1976) was a Norwegian-American Hardanger fiddle maker.

== Background ==
Gunnar Gunnarsson Helland was a member of the Helland fiddle maker family of Bø, Norway. Helland worked in the traditional region of Telemark in the workshop of his father, Gunnar Olavsson Helland, until he emigrated to United States in 1901 and settled in Chippewa Falls, Wisconsin. He had three children: Alton, Edith, and Gilman, with his wife, Edith.

== Career ==
Together with his brother Knut Gunnarsson Helland, he started the Helland Brothers workshop in 1905. His brother died in 1920 and Gunnar Helland ran Helland Brothers alone until he closed down in 1927, at a time when the demand for violins was in decline.

In 1927, Gunnar Helland moved to Minneapolis and spent two years working at Lundh & Rowe for Jacob Lundh (1865-1951) and Frederick Rowe (1884-1976). In 1929, he moved to Fargo, North Dakota where he established the Helland Music Company on the third floor of a building on Broadway. The business remained there until 1962 when it was bought by Lloyd Hammond. Gunnar continued to work for Lloyd Hammond until he was over 80. He built his last Hardanger fiddle in 1937. Gunnar Helland made several design changes on his later violins including lamination inside the sound holes for increased strength, shorter sound holes, a lower profile and a pattern that was much closer to the style of Guarneri del Gesu.

== See also ==
- The Helland fiddle maker family
- Robert "Bud" Larsen
