= Helland (fiddle makers) =

Frontpage from brochure and price list

The Helland family from Bø in Telemark is a Norwegian dynasty of Hardanger fiddle-makers who made the most significant and important contribution to the development of the Norwegian Hardanger fiddle tradition. The celebrated Norwegian fiddler Ole Bull played on Helland fiddles.

During nearly 200 years and four generations the family counted 14 fiddle makers, many of them among the most important in the fiddle-maker tradition in Norway. It may well be the largest fiddle maker family in history.

== Early history ==
Olav Gunnarson Helland settled in Notodden, Telemark, Norway in 1896 and established a Hardanger fiddle workshop. His fiddles are considered among the finest within the tradition.

Knut Gunnarsson Helland and Gunnar Gunnarsson Helland emigrated to US in 1901 and settled in Chippewa Falls, Wisconsin where they became well known ski jumpers. They opened a fiddle workshop, "Helland Brothers" together. Knut died in 1920 and his brother Gunnar continued the business until 1927.

John Gunnarson Helland settled in Skien, Telemark, Norway and ran a workshop and a music shop until his death in 1977.

The other fiddle makers continued their work in Bø until the last, Knut Knutsson Steintjønndalen died in 1969.

== The family 1790–1977 ==
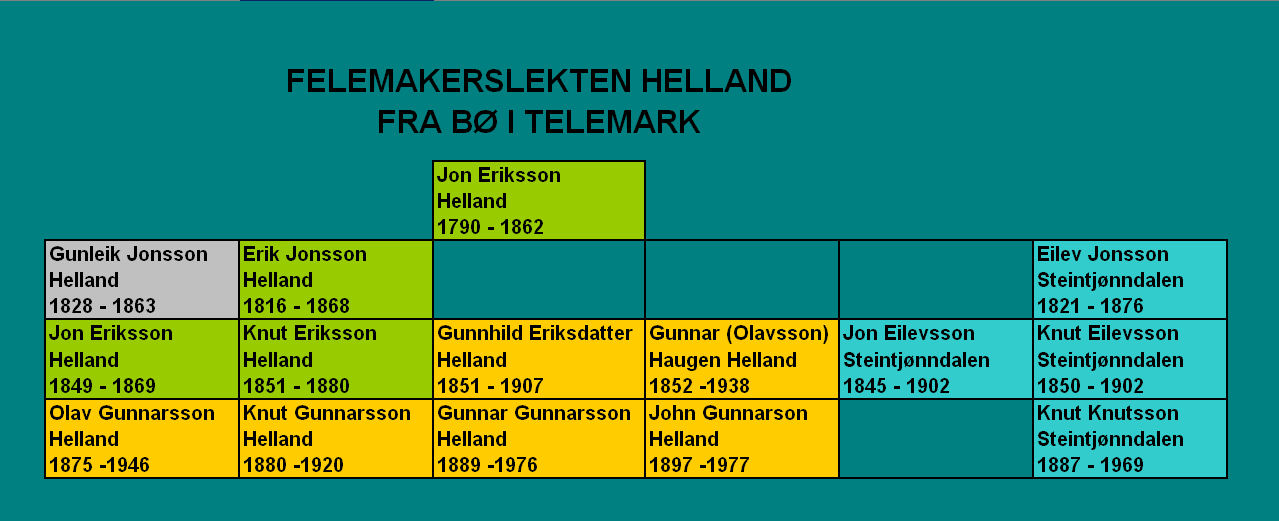
Family tree

Note on older Norwegian names: The second name is a patronymic (meaning literally e.g. "Jon's son" or "Erik's daughter"). The third name is a family name, derived from the farm where they lived, or originated from.

- Jon Eriksson Helland (1790–1862)
  - Erik Jonsson Helland (1816–1868)
    - Jon Eriksson Helland II (1849–1869)
    - Knut Eriksson Helland (1851–1880)
    - Gunnhild Eriksdatter Helland (1851–1907) married Gunnar Olavsson Helland (1852–1938). Gunnar took family name from the farm he got by marriage.
      - Olav Gunnarsson Helland (1875–1946)
      - Knut Gunnarsson Helland (1880–1920)
      - Gunnar Gunnarsson Helland (1889–1976)
      - John Gunnarsson Helland (1897–1977)
  - Eilev Jonsson Steintjønndalen (1821–1876). Took family name of the farm he got by marriage
    - Jon Eilevsson Steintjønndalen (1845–1902)
    - Knut Eilevsson Steintjønndalen (1850–1902)
      - Knut Knutsson Steintjønndalen (1887–1969)
  - Gunleik Jonsson Helland (1828–1863)

== Jon Eilevsson Steintjønndalen ==
Jon Eilevsson learned his trade from his father, Eilev Jonsson Steintjønndalen, and became a fine violin maker. But he gave it up at an early age when he left the area. There are still a number of good Hardanger fiddles left by him.

The great Hardanger fiddle player Halvor Jøren from Bø brought one, named "The Troll", with him to the US, where it disappeared.

== Sources, in Norwegian ==
- Bjørn Aksdal: Hardingfela, felemakerne og instrumentets utvikling. Tapir akademisk forlag Trondheim 2009. ISBN 978-82-519-2402-3 (p. 160)
- Bø-Soga, 1 Kultursoga vol. 1 (Bø Local history).
- Bø-Soga, 2 farm- and family history, vol.4» (Bø Local history, farm- and family history).
- Steinar Kyvik: Soga om fela Fonna 1946.
- John Gunnarson Helland: Felemakerslekten Helland (Helland, the fiddlemaker maker family). Private, type written paper.
- Olav Gunnarsson Helland, private letters.
- Åsmund Nyhammer: Hardingfele i fire slektledd. Newspaper article, interview in Bergens Arbeiderblad 5. oktober 1963.
- Asbjørn Storesund: Bøherad, hardingfelas Cremona in Leik og Dans (periodical) 1988 p. 57-71, Halvard Kaasa, editor.
- Morgenbladet, Christiania, Thursday July 15. 1852.
