= Knut Gunnarsson Helland =

Norwegian-American Hardanger fiddle maker

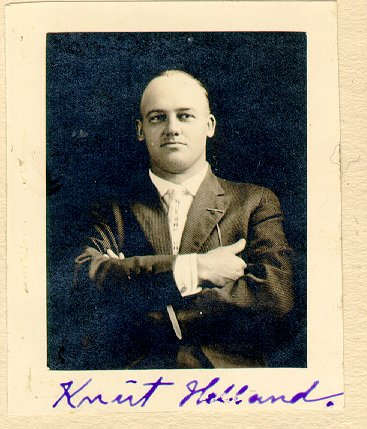
Knut Gunnarsson Helland. Picture taken after 1901

Knut Gunnarsson Helland (November 6, 1880–June 27, 1919) was a Norwegian American Hardanger fiddle maker.

== Biography ==
Knut Gunnarson Helland was from Bø, Norway. Helland worked in the traditional region of Telemark in the workshop of his father, Gunnar Olavsson Helland, until he emigrated to United States in 1901. In 1905, he started Helland Brothers workshop in Chippewa Falls, Wisconsin, with his brother Gunnar Gunnarsson Helland. Knut Helland died in 1919, three weeks after surgery for appendicitis. His brother, Gunnar continued the workshop alone until it was closed down in 1927.

== Hardanger fiddle ==
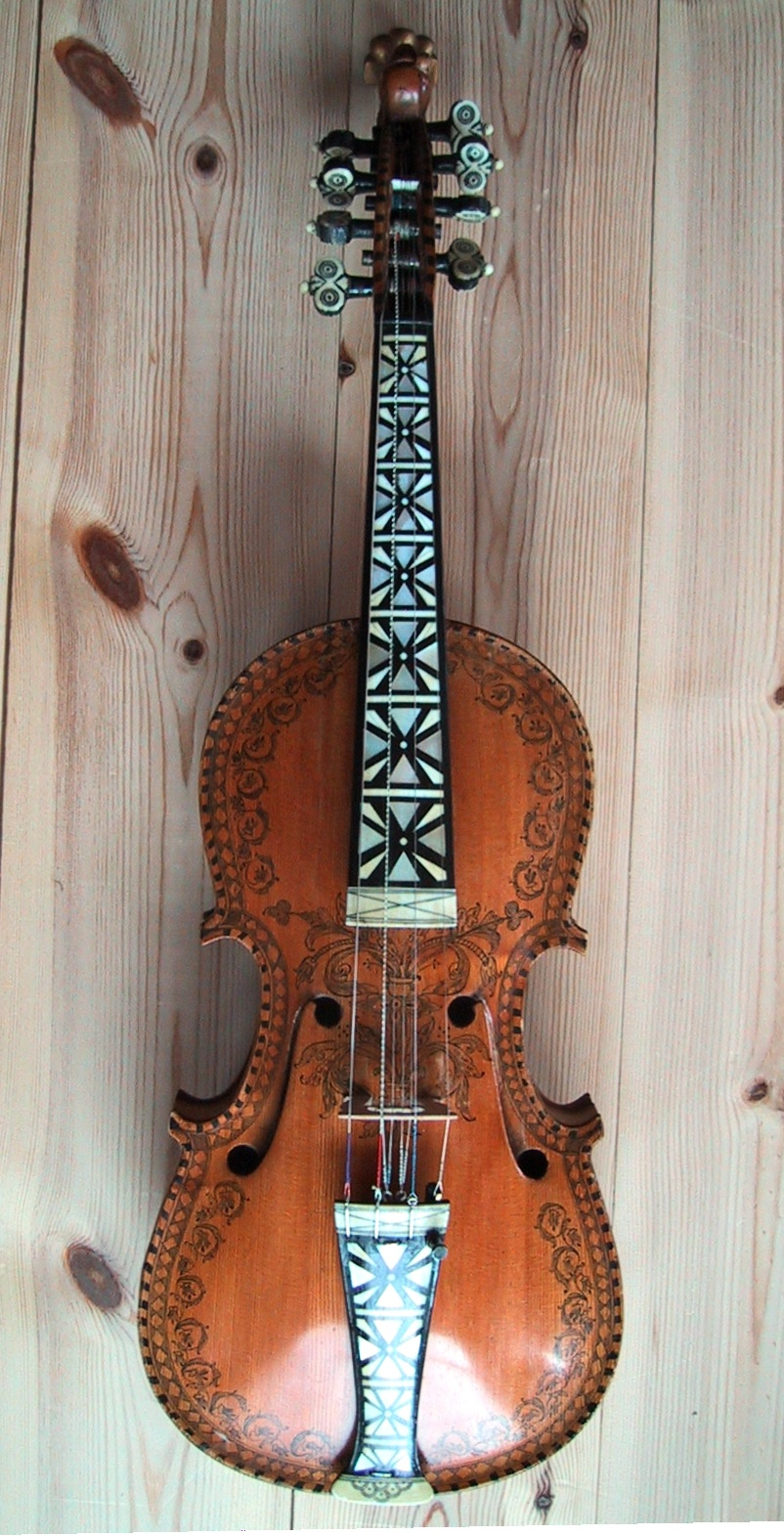
-->

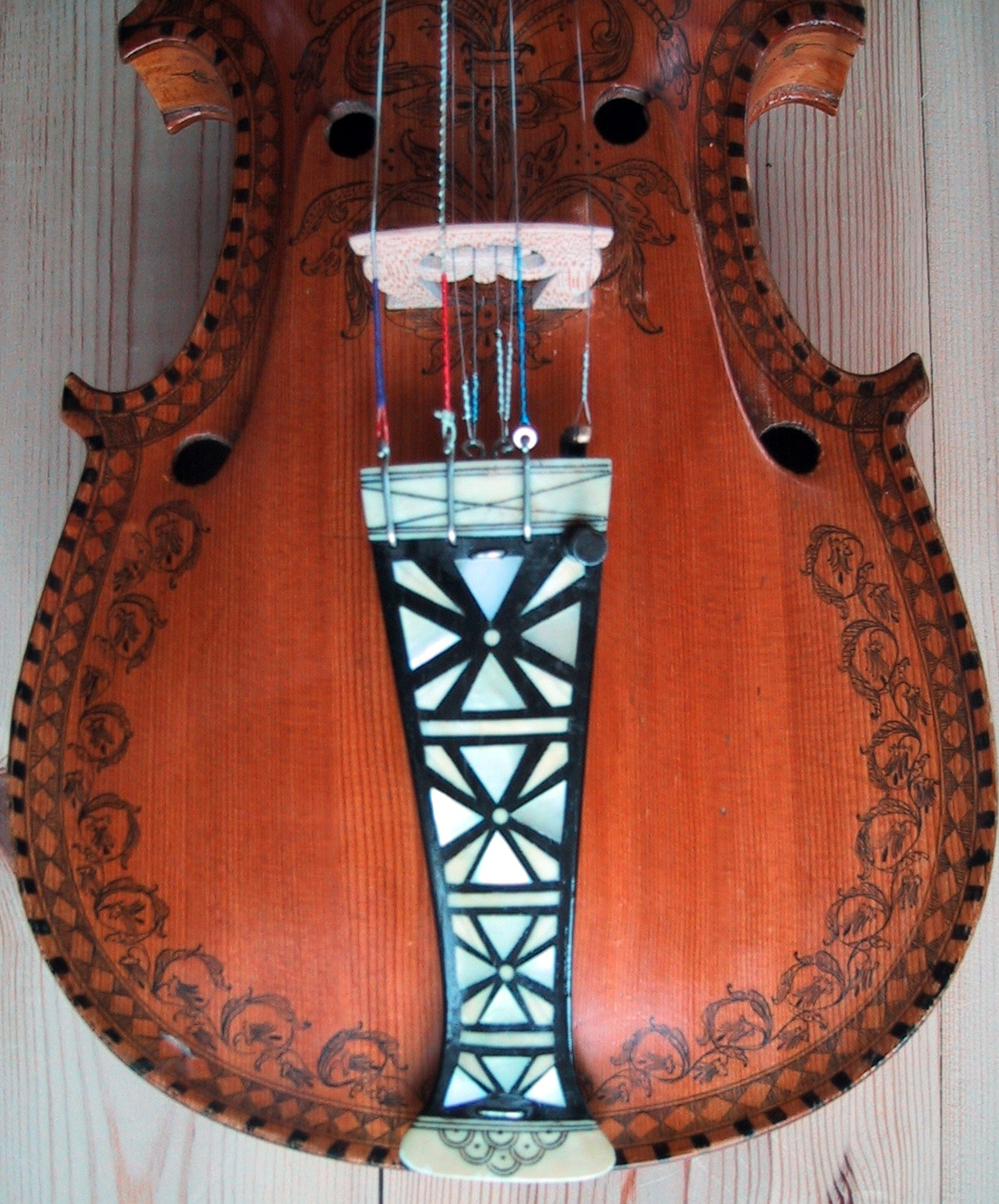
Lower part of body with tailpiece

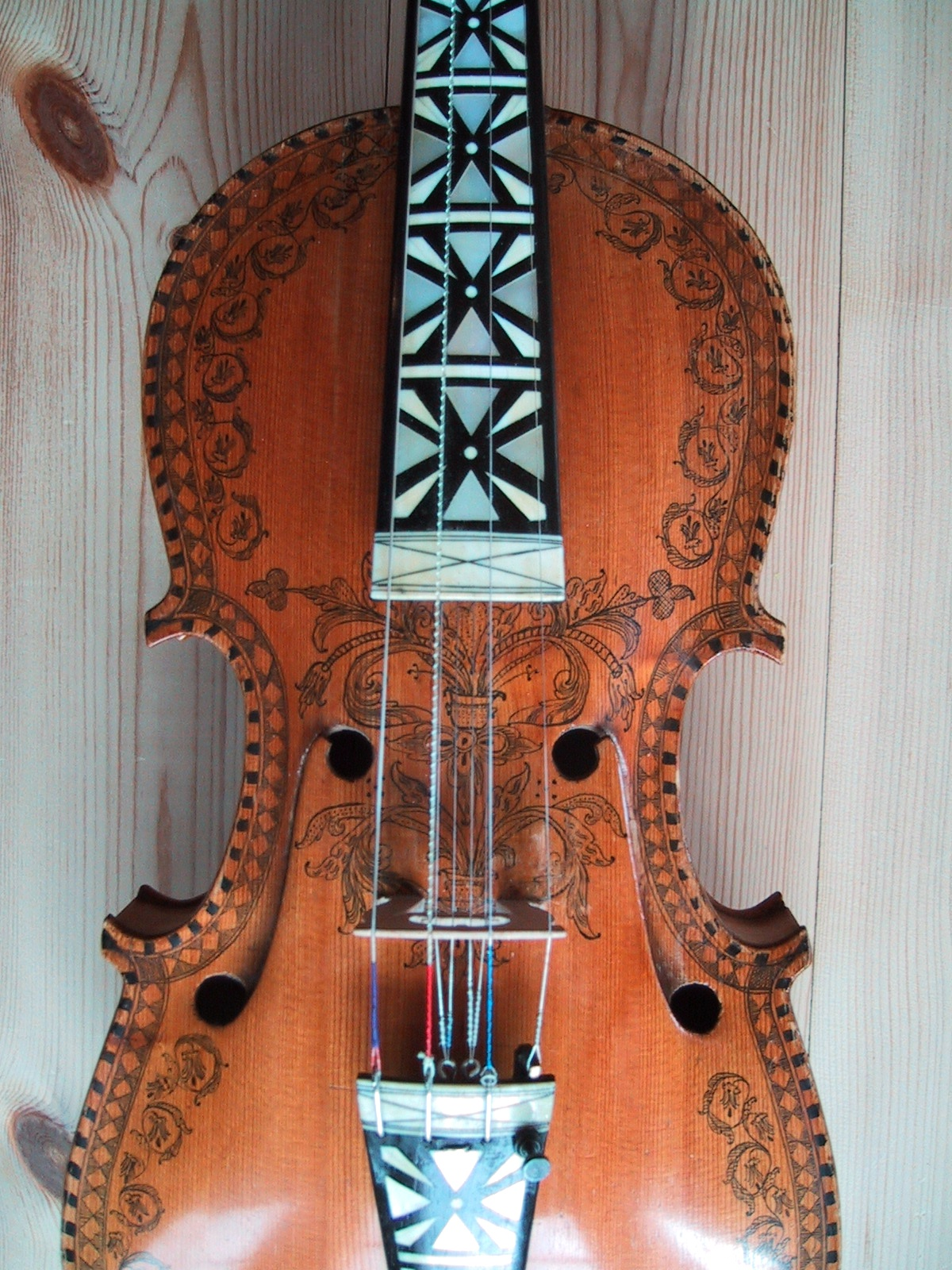
Central part of body

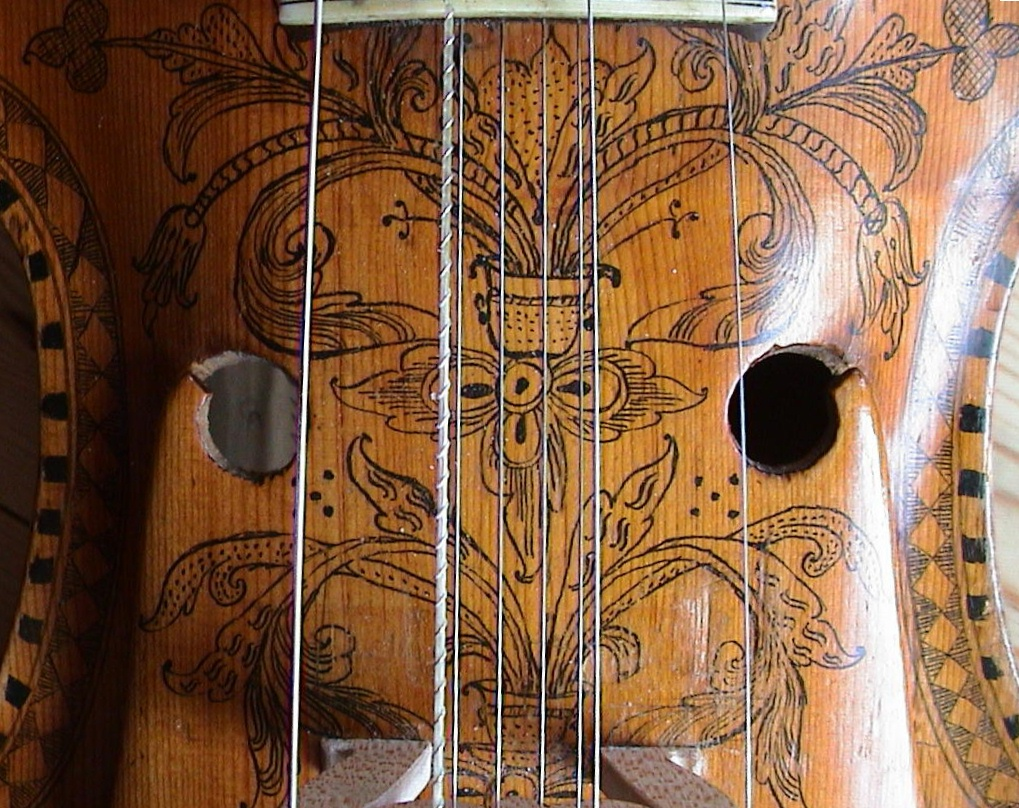
Central part of body, detail

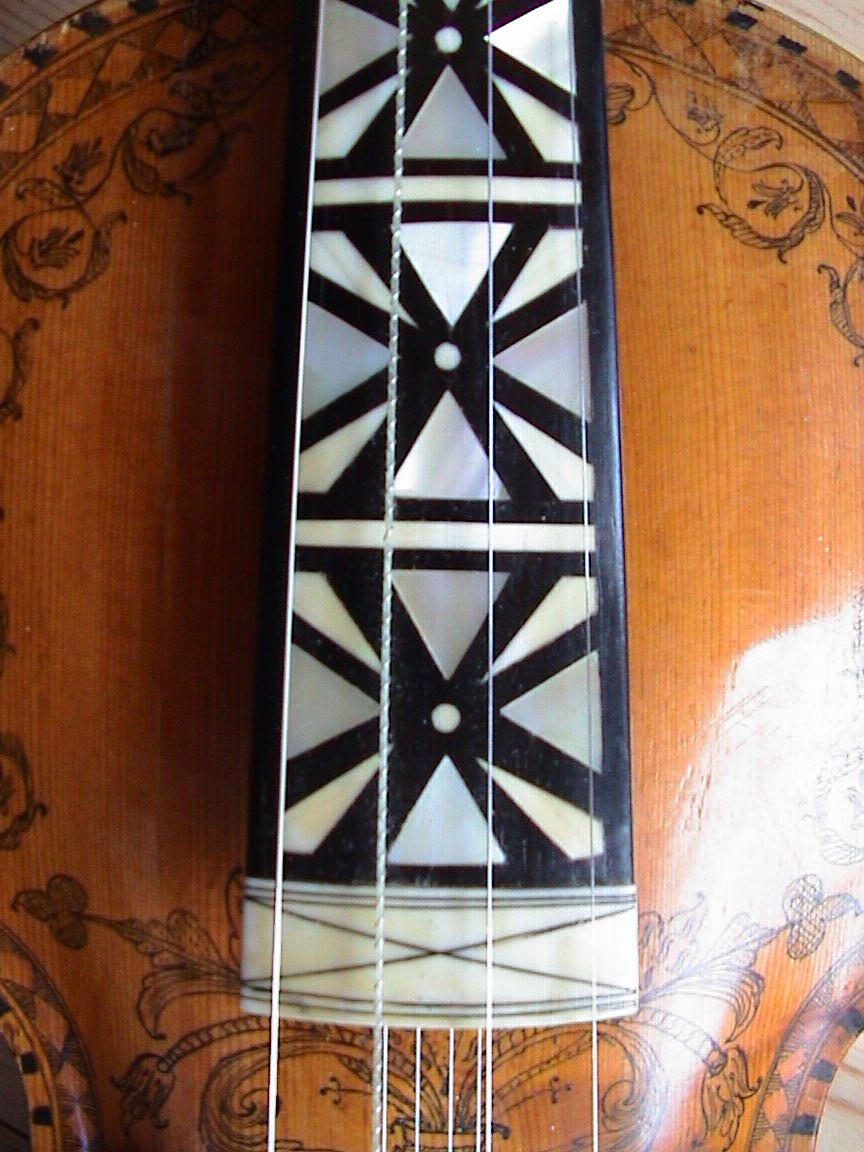
Gripboard

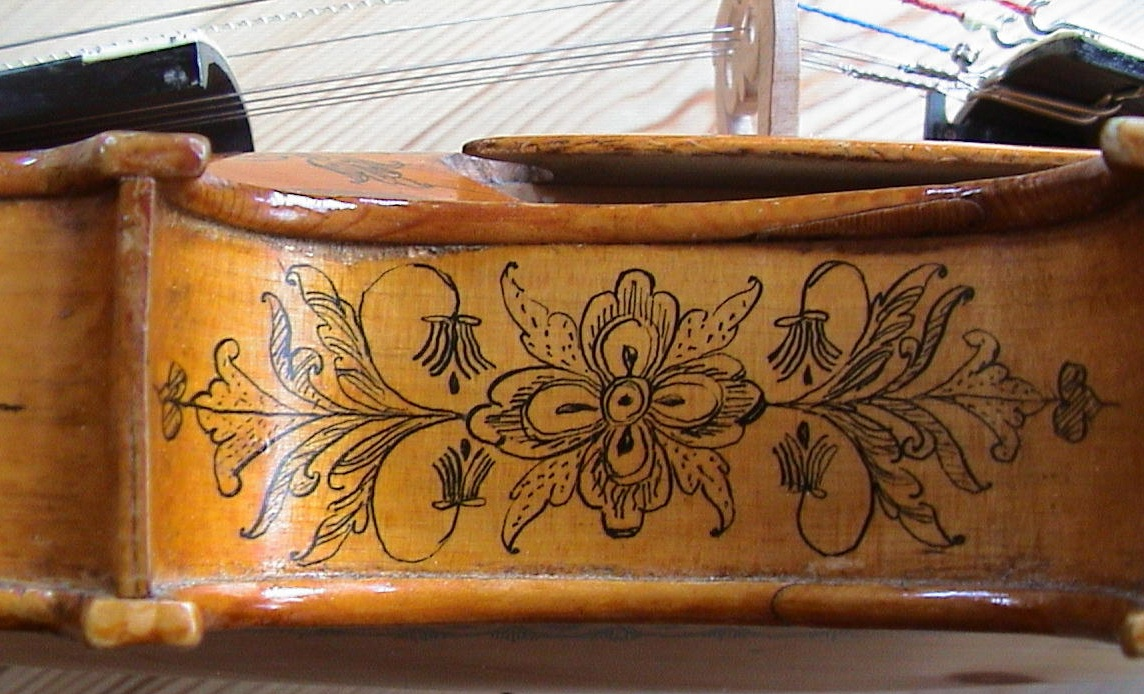
Frame, rosepainting

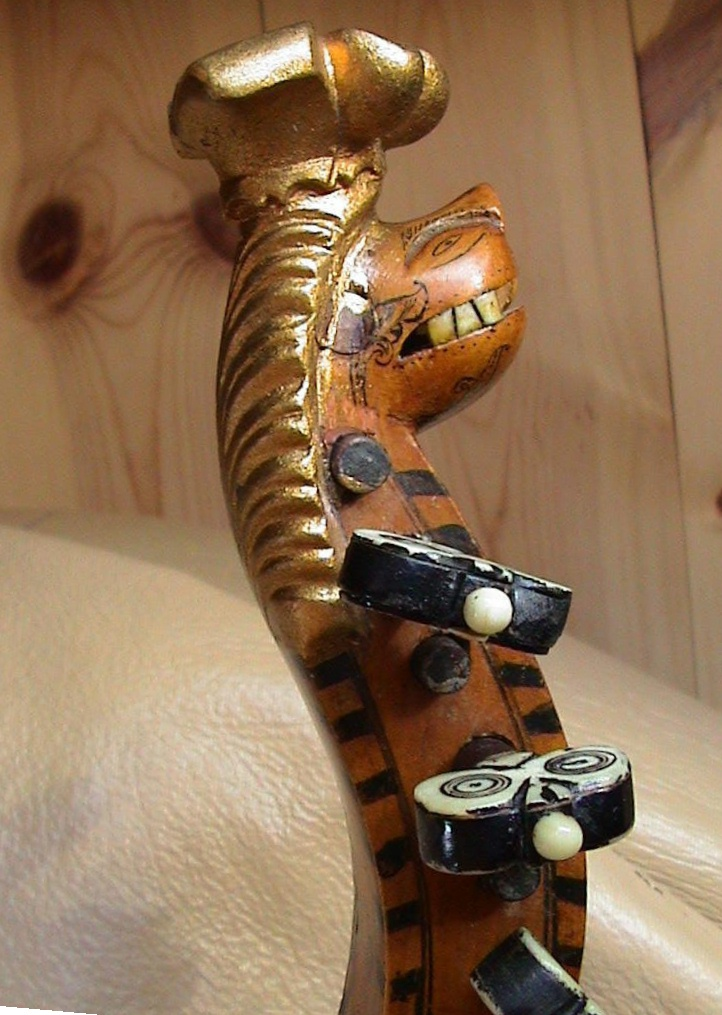
Head

== See also ==
- The Helland fiddle maker family

== Related Reading ==
- Aksdal, Bjørn (2009) Hardingfela felemakere og instrumentets utvikling (Trondheim: Tapir Akademisk Forlag) ISBN 978-82-519-2402-3
