= Jon Eriksson Helland =

Norwegian Hardanger violin maker

Jon Eriksson Helland (1790–1862), born Jon Eriksson Hellos, was a Norwegian Hardanger violin maker from Bø in Telemark.

Jon Eriksson Helland was the first of the Helland family violin making tradition in Bø. His name was originally Jon Eriksson Hellos, and he was born in Bø on the cotter's subfarm of Hellos on the Eika farm. He married Ingeborg Eilevsdatter Helland on the Helland farm and took its name after moving there.

It is said that Jon from Hellos brought the artistic talents into the Helland family. His mother's father was Gunleik Gåra, a well-known master singer. The son of Jon's brother was the master violin player Hans Flatland the elder. Jon Eriksen Helland learned the skill of violin making while serving his military duty in Denmark and, later from Olav Gullbekk and Karl Rue in Telemark.

The major features of his violins, broadly speaking followed the patterns and shapes of the Hardanger violins of that time. He also made violins in the Italian style.

== See also ==
- The Helland fiddle maker family
