= Swedish Double-decker =

Double-deckers are the dominant variant of swedish violins with sympathetic strings

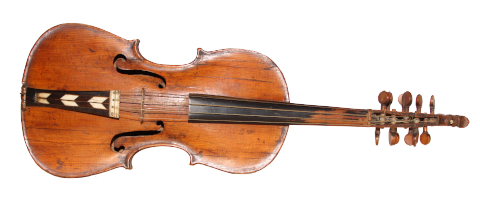
Double-decker made by Hans Severin Nyborg

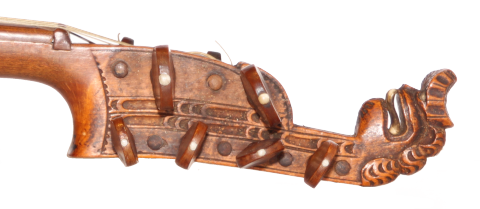
Pegbox with lion head of Double-decker made by Hans Severin Nyborg

Double-decker or Dubbelplansfiol is a recent and colloquial name of the dominant variant of preserved Swedish violins with sympathetic strings; what they were called when they originated in the 18th century is not known. The Swedish collector of musical instruments Daniel Fryklund writes in 1921 that "In Sweden, the author has found several violini d'amore of a peculiar type with 4 strings and 8 resonance strings, of which the later are attached to small pegs, which are placed behind the larger screws for the playing strings in a pegbox which is extended backwards and such an arrangement of the pegs is not observed by the author on any other violin". Thus, Fryklund suggests it is a specific instrument type typical for Sweden, but since he only has observed five instruments he does not conclude it and calls it with the more unspecific name violino d'amore. Today more specimens have been found and out of 27 preserved Swedish violins with sympathetic strings in total, 23 are Double-deckers. Also three of the four preserved instruments that are not Double-deckers are built during the 20th century, while the vast majority of the Double-deckers with a known origin are built during the 18th century, which indicates that the Double-deckers are both earlier and dominant

== Features ==
The Double-decker is characterized by:

- A two level pegbox with the pegs for the sympathetic strings in the lower or back row.
- 4, 6 or 8 sympathetic strings where a vast majority of preserved instruments has 8 sympathetic strings.
- A typical rounded shape around the A-string peg in the upper or front row.
- Lion heads instead of a scroll, although a regular scroll or a man's head occurs in some cases
- A removable fingerboard which can be attached to the neck by pushing it in a conical-shaped cavity in the neck.
- Intarsia on the edges, fingerboard and tailpiece is common. Most typical is a tulip-shaped intarsia in fingerboards created by inlays of parallelogram-shaped pieces of bone, horn or tusk.
- The sympathetic strings are attached to small metal pins next to the endpin rather than in the tailpiece (which is the case for Hardanger fiddles).

== History ==
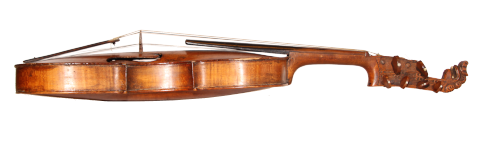
Double-decker made by Hans Severin Nyborg

Nine out of the 27 preserved Double-deckers (the origin of another nine are unknown) originate from a cluster of violin makers in northwestern Scania. The first two luthiers in this cluster are Arwit Rönnegren and Johan Georg Mothe, who served in the Swedish army during the Great Northern War and ended up as prisoners of war in Russia for 14 years following the Battle of Poltava. Mothe was originally from Dresden in Germany but followed Rönnegren to his hometown of Ängelholm after being released in early 1722. When Mothe applied for citizenship in Ängelholm in 1723, he used Rönnegren as a witness. Mothe claimed that he had learned violin making during his years as a prisoner of war and that he wanted to practice violin making in his new home town. Double-deckers are among the most common instrument types preserved after both Mothe and Rönnegren and there are also preserved Double-deckers built by an apprentice to Mothe's son. Most likely Mothe's son, grandson and other apprentices at the Mothe workshop have built Double-deckers, even though there are no instruments preserved

The Double-decker has not been completely unknown, and for a long time there have been two Double-deckers in the collections of the Swedish Museum of Performing Arts in Stockholm. The instrument collector Daniel Fryklund also had one instrument and writes about them all in one of his publications. Anne Nilsson briefly mentions a Double-decker made by Hans Severin Nyborg, as does Bengt Nilsson in their respective work about Swedish luthiers but both authors miss the Double-deckers made by Mothe and Rönnegren. An earlier work about Swedish luthiers and instrument making mentions a violin by Mothe that is suspected to have had sympathetic strings, but omits Rönnegren and Hans Severin Nyborg completely. It was not until recently that it was known that there are more than 20 preserved instruments of the Double-decker type and how dominant this model is among Swedish violins with sympathetic strings.

== Use ==
It is not known to whom the Double-deckers first were sold, but due to the rich decorations and ambitious design, it has been suggested that the original customers were among the many noble families in Scania. There are only two preserved Double-deckers built in the 19th century, which indicates that the production of these instruments declined and later ceased. Possibly Double-deckers found other users among the common people. The sociologist Carl Erik Södling wrote in 1882 that the use of fiddles with resonance or sympathetic strings were popular among the peasantry musicians and in his works there is a picture of a Double-decker that he found on his journeys in the Swedish countryside. There are other stories of fiddlers in the countryside that were supposed to have such instruments, and one Double-decker was owned by the traditional fiddler Edvin Karlsson (1896-1990)

A handful of new Double-deckers were built during the 1980s and the pace of reproduction of these old instruments has increased after the start of the new millennium.

== See also ==
- Nyckelharpa
- Viola d'amore
- Hardanger fiddle
