= Knut Buen =

Norwegian fiddler

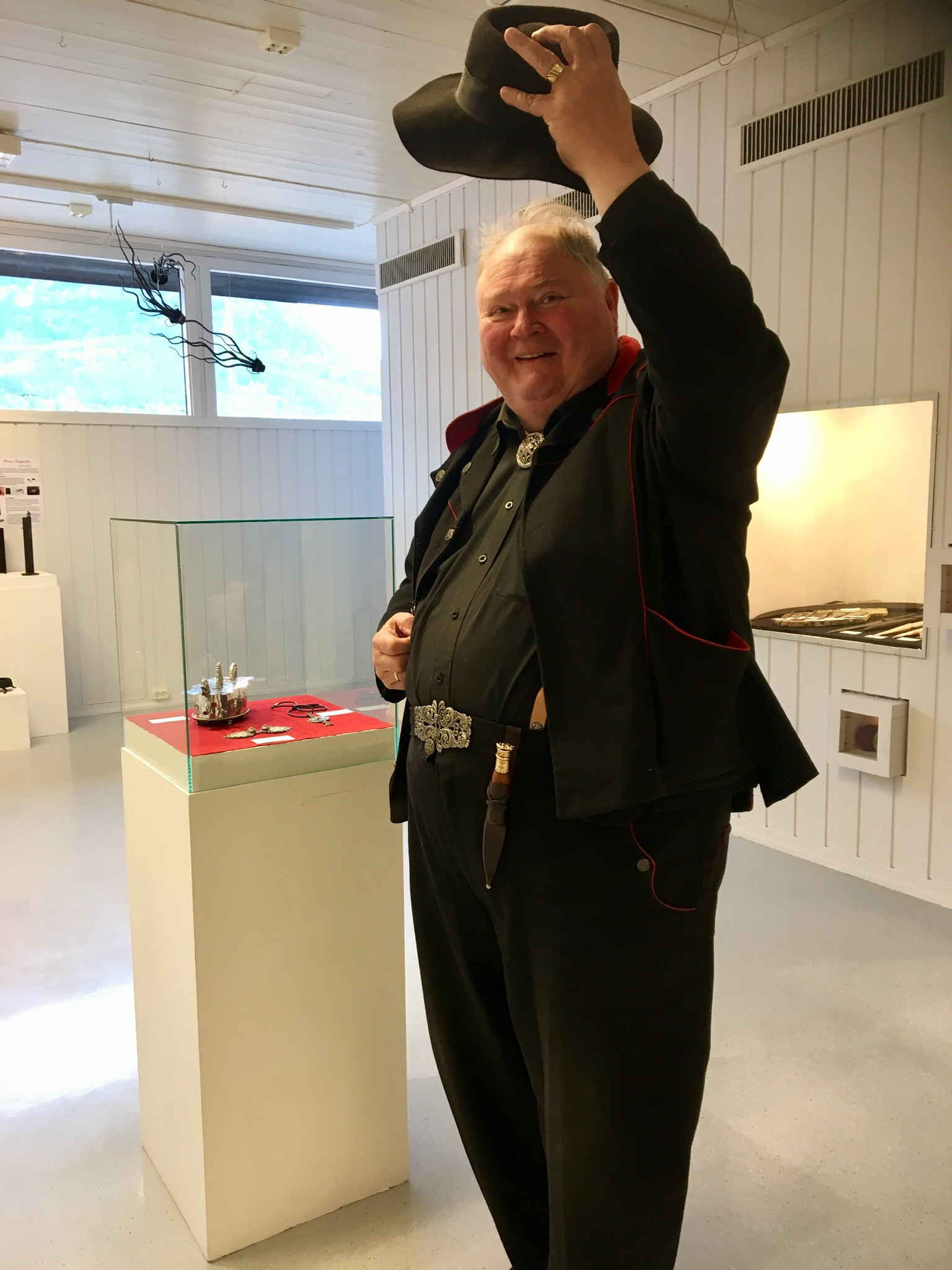
- Born: 31 October 1948 (age 77); Kongsberg, Norway
- Occupations: fiddler, composer, folklorist and publisher
- Relatives: Hauk Buen (brother); Agnes Buen Garnås (sister); Kari Buen (sister)
- Awards: Spellemannprisen (1992, 1994); Order of St. Olav (1999)

Knut Buen (born 31 October 1948) is a Norwegian fiddler, composer, folklorist and publisher. He was born in Kongsberg; the son of folk musician Anders Buen and Margit Tjønn, and is brother of Hauk Buen, Agnes Buen Garnås and the artist Kari Buen. He won the national music contest Landskappleiken in 1983 and 1986, and is known for his collection of traditional songs and melodies. He received Spellemannprisen in 1992 for the album Fykerud'n (in cooperation with Hauk Buen), and in 1994 for the album Bjølleslåtten (together with Kåre Nordstoga and Leif Rygg). He has been running the publishing company Buen kulturverkstad and the record company Nyrenning. He was decorated Knight, First Class of the Order of St. Olav in 1999.
