= Norwegian National Association for Traditional Music and Dance =

Norwegian music and dance organization

Norwegian National Association for Traditional Music and Dance(Norsk Folkemusikk- og Danselag) is a nationwide organization that aims to support the folk music and rural dance tradition in Norway.

The organization (NFD) was founded in 1987 as a breakaway organization from the National Association of Folk Musicians (Landslaget for Spelemenn) which was founded in 1923. NFD arranges seminars and concerts. NFD also has released Kvinten, an annual magazine for traditional folk music. The organization emphasizes the preservation and strengthening of the unbroken oral traditions and the authentic qualities they give to Norwegian instrumental music, folk singing and dancing. In November 2009, the Folk and Traditional Dance Organization in Norway (Folkemusikk- og Folkedansorganisasjonen i Noreg) was founded to combine NFD and Landslaget for Spelemenn

Landslaget for Spelemenn is the largest organization for folk music and folk dance in Norway. The purpose of the organization is to be a driving force in the development of other educational establishments within the instrumental and vocal folk music and folk dance, while they are an interest-based organization for amateur and professional folk musicians. Many prolific folk musicians are members of the organization. The organization has more than 5000 members and about 150 local teams and county teams. The organization is responsible various folk music venues as well as for the Norwegian national folk music magazine, Spelemannsbladet.

== Musical events ==
- Landsfestivalen i gammaldansmusikk (Festival for Old-time Dance Music) - Musical festival of Norwegian folk bands and individual musicians.
- Landskappleiken (Traditional Music and Dance Competition) - Annual gathering and competition of Norwegian folk music and dance, hosted by the National Association of Fiddlers.
- Folkemusikkscena (Folk Music Scene) - Network of folk venues around Norway, with the goal of creating and developing the best venues for folk music and folk dancing.
- Folkelarm (Folk Noise) - An organization for the purpose of promoting folk artists of the Norwegian and international folk and world music industry.

In addition to these, locally sponsored events include:

- Førde Internasjonale Folkemusikkfestival (Førde International Folk Music Festival) - Music festival in Førde in Sogn og Fjordane, featuring multicultural display of music and dance from all corners of the world,
- Telemarkfestivalen (Telemark International Folk Music Festival) - Annual Folk Music Festival at Bø in Telemark presenting original folk music from all over the world.
- Jørn Hilme-Stemnet - Jorn Hilme Music Festival features folk music, especially those with a heritage in the Valdres traditions, in the town of Fagernes in the district of Valdres
- Mokurset - the oldest folk music and dance summer course for young people in Norway
- Strunkeveko - summer school in folk music for children and young adults
- Folkemusikkveka - festival that features traditional music, song and dance held each year in late may in Ål in Hallingdal. It also includes the prestigious traditional fiddle-competition Fanitulltevlinga.
