= Hauk Buen =

Norwegian fiddler (1933–2021)

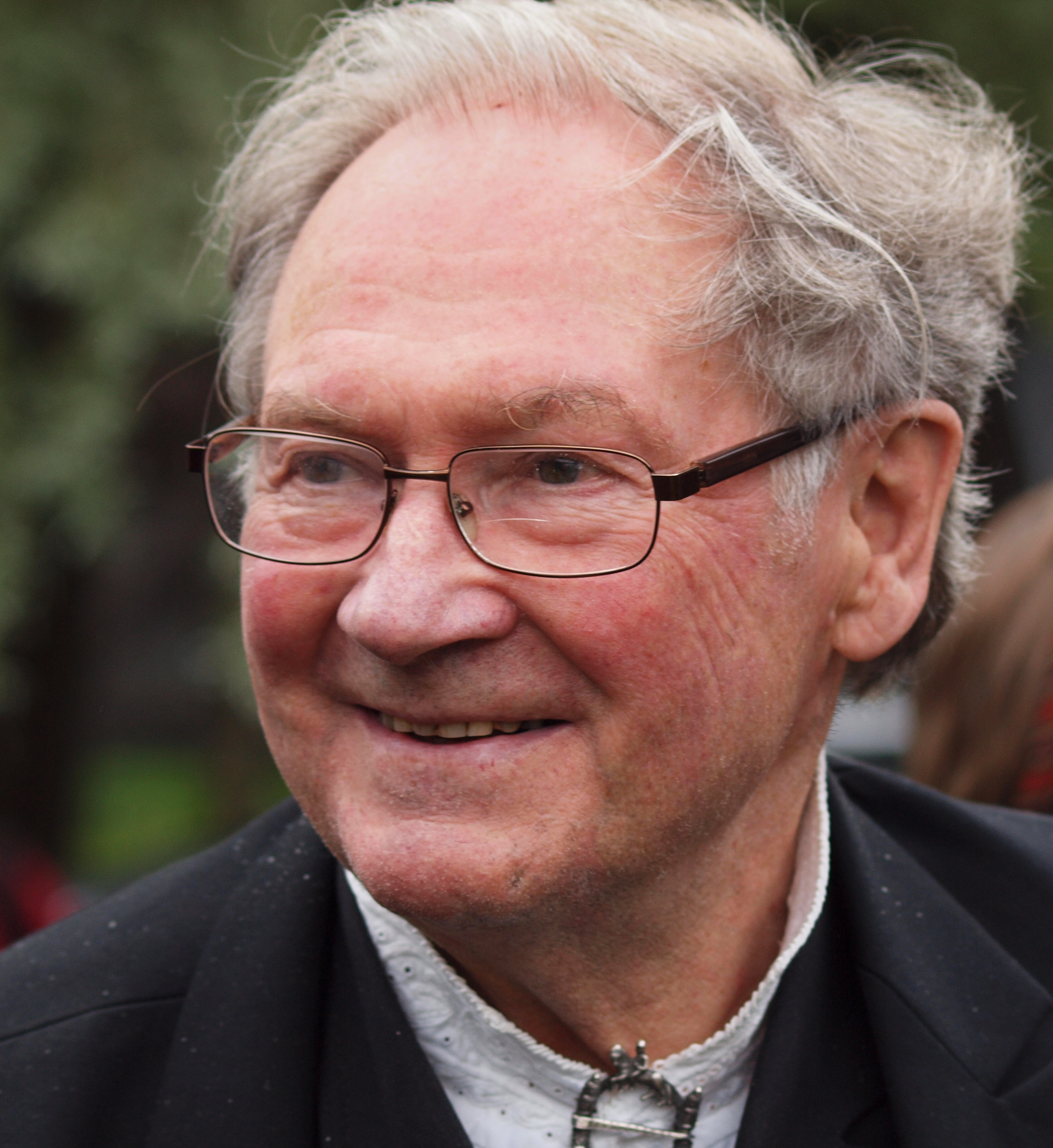
- Buen in 2011
- Born: 11 May 1933; Kongsberg, Norway
- Died: 1 March 2021 (aged 87)
- Occupations: Fiddler; Fiddle maker
- Relatives: Knut Buen (brother); Agnes Buen Garnås (sister); Kari Buen (sister)
- Awards: Spellemannprisen; King's Medal of Merit in gold

Hauk Buen (11 May 1933 – 1 March 2021) was a Norwegian hardingfele fiddler and fiddle maker.

Buen was born in Kongsberg and was a brother of Knut Buen and Agnes Buen Garnås. Among his albums are Fykerud'n from 1992 (in cooperation with his brother Knut), which was awarded Spellemannprisen, and Feledåm from 2000. He was awarded the King's Medal of Merit in gold in 2003.

Buen has inspired and influenced fiddler Annbjørg Lien, who learned several folk tunes from him.

Buen died on 1 March 2020.
