= Hardanger fiddle =

Traditional Norwegian stringed instrument

Hardanger fiddle (hardingfele)
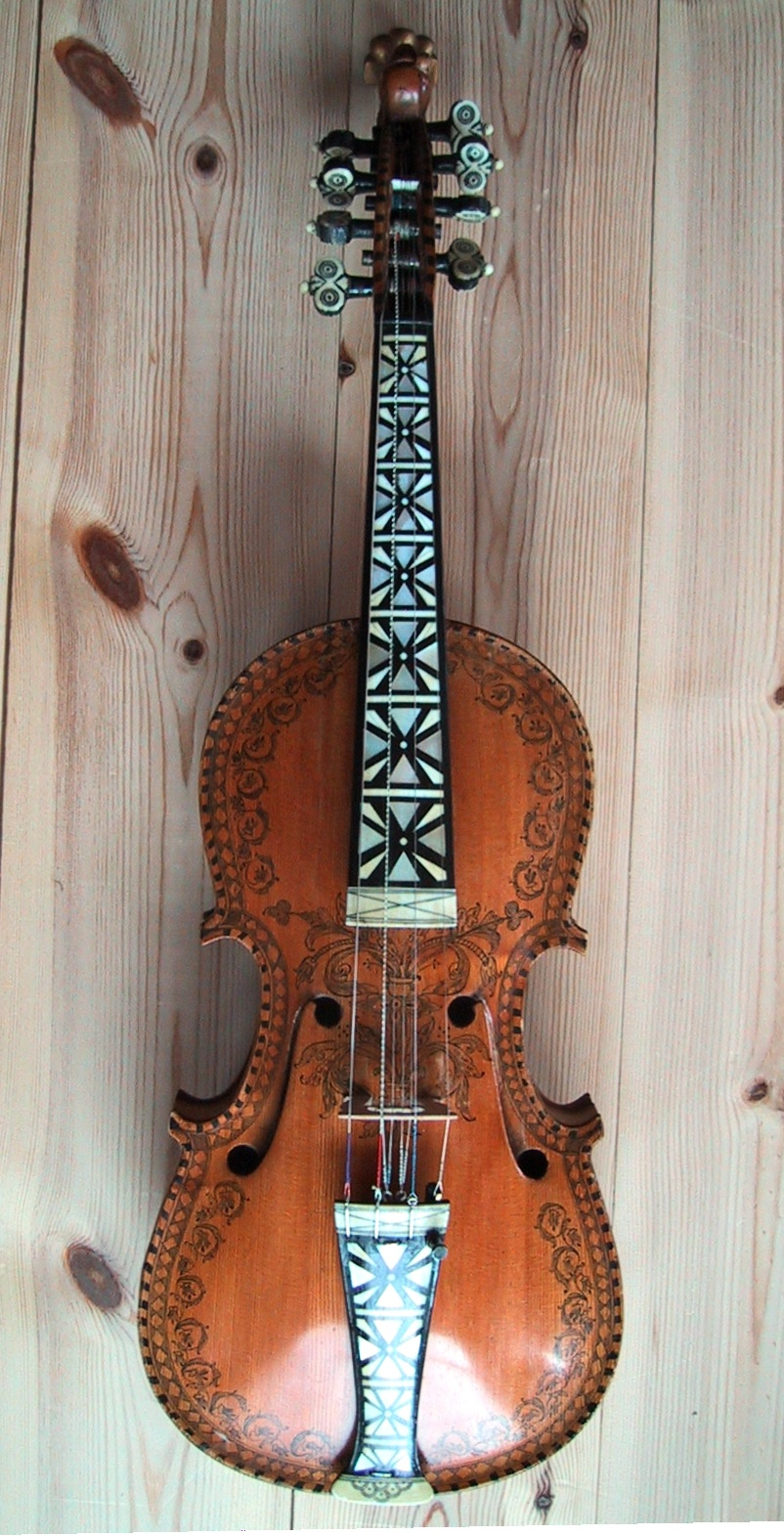
- Classification: Bowed string instrument
- Hornbostel–Sachs classification: 321.322-71

Related instruments
- Fiddle; Violin

Playing a hardanger fiddle

A hardanger fiddle (Norwegian: hardingfele) is a traditional stringed instrument considered the national instrument of Norway. In modern designs, this type of fiddle is very similar to the violin, though with eight or nine strings (rather than four as on a standard violin) and thinner wood. The earliest known example of the hardingfele is from 1651, made by Ole Jonsen Jaastad in Hardanger, Norway. Originally, the instrument had a rounder, narrower body. Around the year 1850, the modern layout with a body much like the violin became the norm.

The F-holes of the hardanger fiddle are distinctive, oftentimes with a more "sunken" appearance, and generally straighter edges (unlike the frilly, swirly F-holes of a violin). Four of the strings are strung and played like a violin, while the rest, named understrings or sympathetic strings, resonate under the influence of the other four. These additional strings are tuned and secured with extra pegs at the top of the scroll, effectively doubling the length of a Hardingfele scroll when compared to a violin. The sympathetic strings, once fastened to their pegs, are funneled through a "hollow" constructed fingerboard, which is built differently than a violin's, being slightly higher and thicker to allow for these extra strings. The resonant strings lie on the center of the special bridge, attached to extra hooks (or fine-tuners) on the tailpiece. Carved out within the center of the bridge is a smaller secondary "bridge", or opening, designed specifically for these resonant strings to pass through. This is where the resonance is picked up and reverberated. As notes are played, the vibrations are sent through the bridge, where the sympathetics echo those notes.

The hardingfele's bridge is unique compared to other bowed instruments. It is somewhat taller and wider, resulting in the strings being slightly lower and further apart; this allows for the easy execution of double-stops (playing of two strings at once). A similar technique is seen in some American old-time and bluegrass fiddlers, who intentionally move their bridge back a few millimetres closer to the tailpiece, for better double-stops. This technique lowers the action, but may not make double stops easier, as the radius of the top of the bridge needs to flatten more to make double stops easier.

The hardingfele is used mainly in the southwest part of Norway, whereas the ordinary violin (called flatfele, 'flat fiddle', or vanlig fele, 'common fiddle') is found elsewhere. The hardingfele is used for dancing, accompanied by rhythmic loud foot stomping. It was also traditional for the fiddler to lead the bridal procession to the entrance of the church, but not inside.

The instrument is often highly decorated, with a carved animal (usually a dragon or the Lion of Norway) or a carved woman's head as part of the scroll at the top of the pegbox, extensive mother of pearl inlay on the tailpiece and fingerboard, and black ink decorations called 'rosing' on the body of the instrument. Pieces of bone are sometimes used to decorate the pegs and the edges of the instrument.

== Tunings ==
Unlike the violin, the hardingfele is a transposing instrument, meaning sheet music for the hardingfele is written in a key other than the one where the instrument sounds when it plays that music. Specifically, the hardingfele is a D instrument, meaning that the hardingfele's written C corresponds to D on a non-transposing instrument, such as the piano. The notes given below for tunings are therefore relative to the hardingfele's written A, not to a concert A.

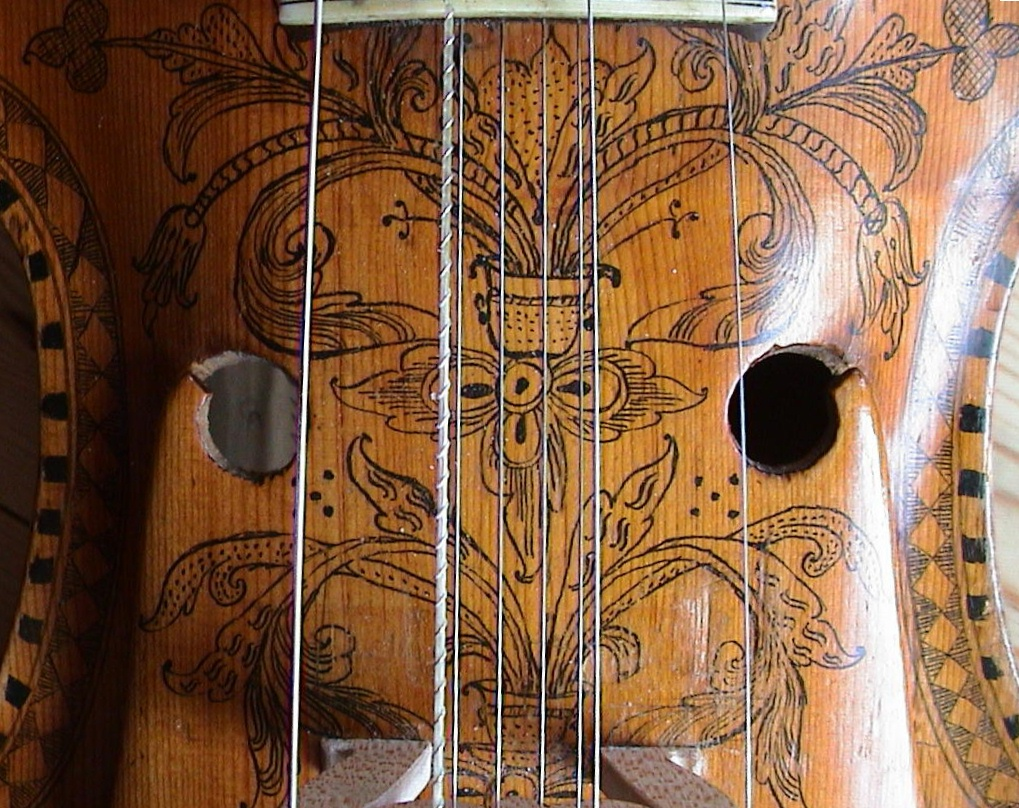
The strings on a hardingfele

The understrings are tuned to vibrate according to the main tuning. For example, when the main strings are tuned A-D-A-E, the understrings are tuned B-D-E-F♯-A. The tuning largely depends on the region in which the instrument is being played, or the requirements of a particular tune.

In Norway, more than 20 different tunings are recorded. Most hardanger tunes are played in a common tuning (A-D-A-E). The hardanger fiddle can also be played in "low bass", the word "bass" referring to the lowest string, (G-D-A-E), the normal violin tuning. In certain regions, the "Gorrlaus" (F-D-A-E) tuning is sometimes used. Many well-known players (such as Annbjørg Lien) frequently employ E-scale tunings; i.e., instead of A-D-A-E, with tunes being mainly played in a D-scale, the instrument will be tuned to B-E-B-F#, so the tunes are mostly in an E-scale. Going higher still, the player Knut Buen recorded several albums in an F-scale tuning, C-F-C-G. This is possible only on a smaller-bodied instrument (such as a hardanger fiddle), being rarely attempted on a standard full-sized violin. As a substitute, many fiddlers who play standard violins will simply tune their G string to A, using the A-D-A-E tuning, enabling them to play the same style of music.

Another tuning is called "troll tuning" (A-E-A-C♯). Troll tuning is used for the fanitullen tunes, also called the devil's tunes, as well as the tunes from the Kivlemøyane suite (thus associated with the hulderpeople as well as the devil). In the Valdres district of Norway, using this particular tuning is called "greylighting", a reminder that the fiddler tuned his fiddle like this when the morning was near, and he had played himself through a number of other tunings.

Legend has it that the fiddler learned fanitullen tunes from the devil. This tuning limits the melodic range of the tunes and is therefore sparsely used.

== Technique ==
The technique of bowing a hardingfele also differs from that used with a violin. It's a smoother, bouncier style of bowing, with a lighter touch. The player usually bows on two of the upper strings at a time, and sometimes three. This is made easy by the relative flatness of the bridge, unlike the more curved bridge on a violin. The objective is to create a continuous sound of two (or more due to the sympathetic understrings) pitches. The strings of the fiddle are slimmer than those of the violin, resembling the strings of violins from the baroque period. Many classically trained violinists use a baroque bow when playing the hardingfele in order to counteract the extra weight that classical violinists naturally place on the string.

Here is an example of technique shown by Rose Logan with an instrument held at St Cecilia's Hall.

== The hardanger fiddle and religion ==
The hardingfele has had a long history with the Christian church. Well known early fiddle maker Isak Botnen is said to have learned some of his craft from church lay leader and school master Lars Klark, along with the methods for varnishing from pastor Dedrik Muus. In many folktales, the devil is associated with the hardingfele; in fact many good players were said to have been taught to play by the devil, if not by the nix. During religious revivals in the 19th century, many fiddles (regular and hardanger) were destroyed or hidden both by fiddlers and laypeople who thought "that it would be best for the soul that the fiddles be burned", as it was viewed as a "sinful instrument that encouraged wild dances, drinking and fights." This happened in Norway, as well as other parts of Europe, and until the 20th century playing a hardanger fiddle in a church building was forbidden. Some fiddlers, however, played on, in spite of all condemnation, and thus valuable traditions remained intact. The first folk musicians to perform in a church were the fiddlers Johannes Dahle from Tinn Municipality, and Gjermund Haugen from Notodden Municipality. Dahle performed in the 1920s.

Known modern fiddler Annbjørg Lien has played with church organist Iver Kleive, but even she has experienced prejudice before performance from the religious side. Also, the oldest known fiddles still in existence can be heard accompanied by the oldest playable church pipe organ in Norway (originally built for an 18th-century church) on the album "Rosa i Botnen" by Knut Hamre and Benedicte Maurseth. While the use of a hardingfele in church in Norway may still be a bit sensitive for some, fiddlers in other parts of the world have no problems playing in churches for all types of occasions, including weddings.

== Influences ==
Edvard Grieg adapted many hardanger folk tunes into his compositions, and composed tunes for the hardanger as part of his score for Ibsen's Peer Gynt Suite No. 1. The opening phrase of "Morning" from Grieg's Peer Gynt music is derived from the tuning of the sympathetic strings of the hardanger fiddle: A F♯ E D E F♯ and so on.

In recent years, the instrument has gained recognition in the rest of the world. Japan has been one of the countries that has found an interest in the hardingfele and Japanese musicians travel to Norway just to learn to play this instrument. In 1997, the Australian classical composer Liza Lim wrote the piece Philtre for a solo hardanger fiddle, and she also includes the instrument in her work Winding Bodies: 3 Knots (2013–14). Her string quartet The Weaver's Knot (2013–14) is inspired by the sound and performance techniques of hardanger fiddle playing. Another recent work is "mobius II" for hardanger fiddle and electronics by the British composer Rose Dodd (2011, premiered at the Huddersfield Contemporary Music Festival by Britt Pernille Froholm).

== Players ==
Notable hardingfele players include Lillebjørn Nilsen, Knut Buen, Hauk Buen, Olav Jørgen Hegge, Annbjørg Lien, Sigrid Moldestad, Myllarguten (Targjei Augundsson), Lars Fykerud, Lars Jensen, Nils Økland, Tuva Syvertsen, Benedicte Maurseth, Anne Hytta, Gjermund Haugen and fiddler Kathryn Tickell, the Irish fiddlers Caoimhín Ó Raghallaigh and Mairéad Ní Mhaonaigh, and American players Loretta Kelley, Andrea Een, Dan Trueman and the multi instrumentalist David Lindley.

In March 2010, Olav Luksengård Mjelva won the Spellemannprisen Traditional music/Norwegian folk category (the Norwegian equivalent of the Grammy Awards), for his album Fele/Hardingfele, Røros/Hallingdal.

== Use in film ==
The hardanger fiddle was used in the soundtracks of The Lord of the Rings: The Two Towers, and The Lord of the Rings: The Return of the King composed by Howard Shore, to provide the main voice for the Rohan theme. The use of the hardanger fiddle in this movie, however, is far from traditional: the theme does not use the idiomatic double stops, and the violinist also used vibrato, which is not traditionally used. It was also used by composer John Powell and played by Dermot Crehan in the DreamWorks film How to Train Your Dragon for the main romantic theme.

The hardanger fiddle is also featured in the soundtrack of Armageddon (composed by Trevor Rabin), and in Fargo (composed by Carter Burwell). In the latter, the context is a little more traditional—the main theme it plays is an arrangement of a Norwegian folk song entitled "The Lost Sheep".

Steven Van Zandt used the hardanger fiddle in the theme song he wrote for the TV series Lilyhammer.

In the Japanese animated movie Tales from Earthsea it is played by Rio Yamase.

The hardanger fiddle is featured in the soundtrack of the 2017 film Dunkirk, as well as the soundtrack for the 2021 Loki series.

== See also ==
- Låtfiol, a Swedish fiddle with two sympathetic strings
- Nyckelharpa
- Kontra
- Stroh violin (vioara cu goarnă)
- Rabeca
- Viola d'amore
- Swedish Double-decker, a Swedish fiddle with 4-8 sympathetic strings
