= Bø Municipality (Telemark) =

Former municipality in Norway

Bø Municipality Bø kommune
- Former municipality
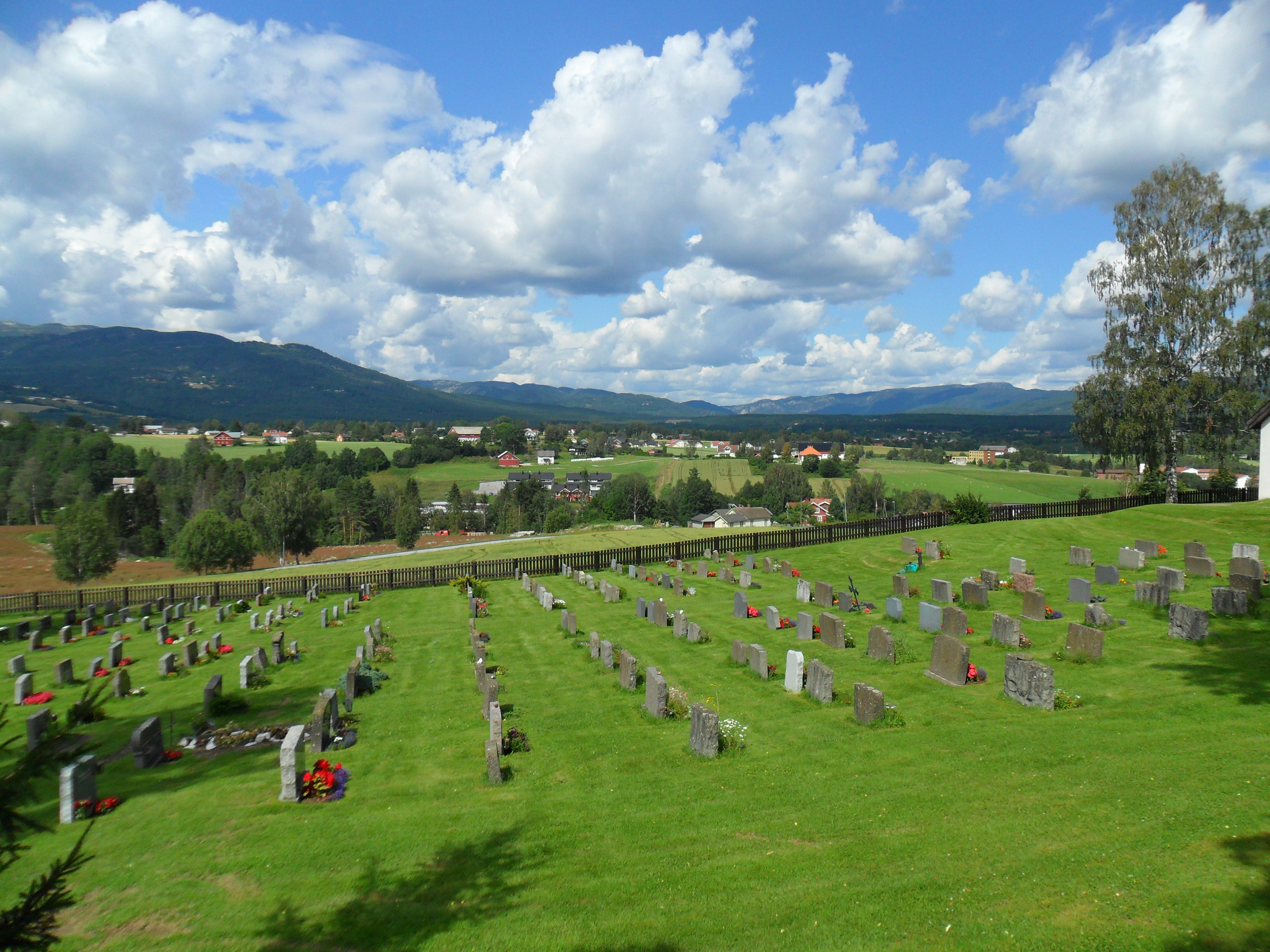
- View of Bø from the Bø Church churchyard

- Flag Coat of arms

- Telemark within Norway

- Bø within Telemark
- Coordinates: 59°27′26″N 9°1′53″E
- Country: Norway
- County: Telemark
- District: Midt-Telemark
- Established: 1 Jan 1838
  - Created as: Formannskapsdistrikt
- Disestablished: 1 Jan 2020
  - Succeeded by: Midt-Telemark Municipality
- Administrative centre: Bø i Telemark

Government
  - Mayor (2011–2019): Olav Kasland (V)

Area (upon dissolution)
  - Total: 263.20 km^{2} (101.62 sq mi)
  - Land: 258.25 km^{2} (99.71 sq mi)
  - Water: 4.95 km^{2} (1.91 sq mi) 1.9%
  - Rank: #291 in Norway
- Highest elevation: 1,274.8 m (4,182 ft)

Population (2019)
  - Total: 6,630
  - Rank: #161 in Norway
  - Density: 25.7/km^{2} (67/sq mi)
  - Change (10 years): ▲ +20.2%
- Demonym: Bøhering

Official language
  - Norwegian form: Nynorsk
- Time zone: UTC+01:00 (CET)
  - Summer (DST): UTC+02:00 (CEST)
- ISO 3166 code: NO-0821

Bø (Norwegian pronunciation: [bøː]; locally [bøʏ]) is a former municipality in Telemark county, Norway. The 263.2-square-kilometre (101.6 sq mi) municipality existed from 1838 until its dissolution in 2020. The area is now part of Midt-Telemark Municipality in the traditional district of Midt-Telemark, but this area was historically regarded as part of Grenland. The administrative centre was the village of Bø i Telemark. Other villages in the municipality included Folkestad and Nordbøåsane

Prior to its dissolution in 2020, the 263.2-square-kilometre (101.6 sq mi) municipality was the 291st largest by area out of the 422 municipalities in Norway. Bø Municipality was the 161st most populous municipality in Norway with a population of 6,630. The municipality's population density was 25.7 inhabitants per square kilometre (67/sq mi) and its population had increased by 20.2% over the previous 10-year period.

Bø's economy was mainly based on agriculture, forestry, tourism, education, and public administration. Bø had the character of a university town and it was home to one of the principal campuses of the University of Southeast Norway; it was also the seat of one of the university's three predecessor institutions, Telemark University College. Bø was well known for its cultural traditions within traditional music and artisanship, and its central position within Norwegian national romanticism (for example, its Bunad traditions). Several times in modern literature Bø had been called "the most beautiful place on earth", such as in Bjørnstjerne Bjørnson's story En glad Gut (A Happy Boy).

== General information ==
=== Administrative history ===
The formannskapsdistrikt law of 1837 created a system of local government in Norway by establishing each town (ladested or kjøpstad) and each Church of Norway prestegjeld as a civil municipality. On 1 January 1838, Bø prestegjeld was established as Bø Municipality. On 1 January 1866, an unpopulated area of Bø Municipality was transferred to the neighboring Hollen Municipality. On 1 January 1867, Bø Municipality was divided as follows: the southern district (population: 2,257) became the new Lunde Municipality and the northern district (population: 2,633) continued as a smaller Bø Municipality.

On 1 January 1883, the borders of Bø were adjusted. An area from neighboring Seljord Municipality (population: 235) and an area from neighboring Hitterdal Municipality (population: 42) were both transferred into Bø Municipality. On 1 July 1914, an area of neighboring Sauherad Municipality (population: 27) was transferred into Bø Municipality.

On 1 January 2020, Bø Municipality was dissolved and the following areas were merged to form the new Midt-Telemark Municipality:

- all of Bø Municipality (population: 6,630)
- most of Sauherad Municipality (population: 4,293), except for the Hjukse area which became part of Notodden Municipality

=== Name ===
The municipality is named after the old Bø prestegjeld. The prestegjeld was named after the old Bø farm (Old Norse: Bœr) since the Old Bø Church was built there. The name is identical with the word bœr which means "homestead" or "farm".

=== Coat of arms ===
The coat of arms was granted on 19 February 1988 and it was in use until 1 January 2020 when Bø became part of Midt-Telemark Municipality. The official blazon is "Gules, three fiddles Or" (Norwegian: På raud grunn tre gull feler, 2-1). This means the arms have a red field (background) and the charge is a set of three fiddles (two over one). The charge has a tincture of Or which means it is commonly colored yellow, but if it is made out of metal, then gold is used. Bø is historically known for its musical tradition, as well as the production of fiddles (similar to the hardingfele). The fiddle was thus chosen as an appropriate symbol for the municipality. The arms were designed by Halvor Holtskog, Jr. The municipal flag has the same design as the coat of arms.

=== Churches ===
The Church of Norway had one parish (sokn) within Bø Municipality. It was part of the Øvre Telemark prosti (deanery) in the Diocese of Agder og Telemark.

Churches in Bø Municipality
Parish (sokn)	Church name	Location of the church	Year built
Bø	Bø Church	Bø	1875
Bø	Old Bø Church	Bø	c. 1100

== Geography ==
The highest point in the municipality was the 1,274.8-metre (4,182 ft) tall mountain Jøronnatten, a tripoint on the border of Bø Municipality, Seljord Municipality, and Notodden Municipality. Notodden Municipality was located to the north, Sauherad Municipality was located to the east, Nome Municipality was located to the south, and Seljord Municipality was located to the west.

== Education ==
In 1923, Telemark county decided to start a secondary school in Bø, the equivalent of today's middle school or "ungdomsskole", called "Telemark Realskole". At this time secondary schools mostly existed in the larger towns and cities, and most youngsters ended their schooling after 7 years around the time they became teenagers. It was the county's intention to expand this school to a high school as soon as practically possible. This happened in 1947, and the school's name was "Telemark Offentlige Landsgymnas". The existence of this school made it possible to establish Telemark College (Distriktshøgskulen i Telemark), which evolved into Telemark University College.

== Government ==
While it existed, Bø Municipality was responsible for primary education (through 10th grade), outpatient health services, senior citizen services, welfare and other social services, zoning, economic development, and municipal roads and utilities. The municipality was governed by a municipal council of directly elected representatives. The mayor was indirectly elected by a vote of the municipal council. The municipality was under the jurisdiction of the Aust-Telemark District Court and the Agder Court of Appeal.

=== Municipal council ===
The municipal council (Kommunestyre) of Bø Municipality was made up of 25 representatives that were elected to four year terms. The tables below show the historical composition of the council by political party.

Bø kommunestyre 2015–2019
Party name (in Nynorsk)	Number of representatives
Labour Party (Arbeidarpartiet)	6
Progress Party (Framstegspartiet)	2
Green Party (Miljøpartiet Dei Grøne)	2
Conservative Party (Høgre)	2
Christian Democratic Party (Kristeleg Folkeparti)	2
Centre Party (Senterpartiet)	3
Socialist Left Party (Sosialistisk Venstreparti)	1
Liberal Party (Venstre)	7
Total number of members:	25
Note: On 1 January 2020, Bø Municipality became part of Midt-Telemark Municipality.

Bø kommunestyre 2011–2015
Party name (in Nynorsk)	Number of representatives
Labour Party (Arbeidarpartiet)	5
Progress Party (Framstegspartiet)	2
Conservative Party (Høgre)	3
Christian Democratic Party (Kristeleg Folkeparti)	2
Centre Party (Senterpartiet)	2
Socialist Left Party (Sosialistisk Venstreparti)	2
Liberal Party (Venstre)	9
Total number of members:	25

Bø kommunestyre 2007–2011
Party name (in Nynorsk)	Number of representatives
Labour Party (Arbeidarpartiet)	7
Progress Party (Framstegspartiet)	4
Conservative Party (Høgre)	2
Christian Democratic Party (Kristeleg Folkeparti)	3
Centre Party (Senterpartiet)	3
Socialist Left Party (Sosialistisk Venstreparti)	2
Liberal Party (Venstre)	4
Total number of members:	25

Bø kommunestyre 2003–2007
Party name (in Nynorsk)	Number of representatives
Labour Party (Arbeidarpartiet)	9
Progress Party (Framstegspartiet)	4
Conservative Party (Høgre)	2
Christian Democratic Party (Kristeleg Folkeparti)	2
Centre Party (Senterpartiet)	4
Socialist Left Party (Sosialistisk Venstreparti)	3
Liberal Party (Venstre)	1
Total number of members:	25

Bø kommunestyre 1999–2003
Party name (in Nynorsk)	Number of representatives
Labour Party (Arbeidarpartiet)	9
Progress Party (Framstegspartiet)	3
Conservative Party (Høgre)	3
Christian Democratic Party (Kristeleg Folkeparti)	2
Centre Party (Senterpartiet)	4
Socialist Left Party (Sosialistisk Venstreparti)	2
Liberal Party (Venstre)	2
Total number of members:	25

Bø kommunestyre 1995–1999
Party name (in Nynorsk)	Number of representatives
Labour Party (Arbeidarpartiet)	9
Progress Party (Framstegspartiet)	3
Conservative Party (Høgre)	3
Christian Democratic Party (Kristeleg Folkeparti)	2
Centre Party (Senterpartiet)	4
Socialist Left Party (Sosialistisk Venstreparti)	2
Liberal Party (Venstre)	2
Total number of members:	25

Bø kommunestyre 1991–1995
Party name (in Nynorsk)	Number of representatives
Labour Party (Arbeidarpartiet)	8
Progress Party (Framstegspartiet)	1
Conservative Party (Høgre)	2
Christian Democratic Party (Kristeleg Folkeparti)	2
Centre Party (Senterpartiet)	8
Socialist Left Party (Sosialistisk Venstreparti)	3
Liberal Party (Venstre)	1
Total number of members:	25

Bø kommunestyre 1987–1991
Party name (in Nynorsk)	Number of representatives
Labour Party (Arbeidarpartiet)	11
Progress Party (Framstegspartiet)	2
Conservative Party (Høgre)	3
Christian Democratic Party (Kristeleg Folkeparti)	2
Centre Party (Senterpartiet)	3
Socialist Left Party (Sosialistisk Venstreparti)	2
Liberal Party (Venstre)	2
Total number of members:	25

Bø kommunestyre 1983–1987
Party name (in Nynorsk)	Number of representatives
Labour Party (Arbeidarpartiet)	12
Conservative Party (Høgre)	4
Christian Democratic Party (Kristeleg Folkeparti)	3
Centre Party (Senterpartiet)	3
Socialist Left Party (Sosialistisk Venstreparti)	1
Liberal Party (Venstre)	2
Total number of members:	25

Bø kommunestyre 1979–1983
Party name (in Nynorsk)	Number of representatives
Labour Party (Arbeidarpartiet)	11
Conservative Party (Høgre)	4
Christian Democratic Party (Kristeleg Folkeparti)	3
Centre Party (Senterpartiet)	3
Socialist Left Party (Sosialistisk Venstreparti)	1
Liberal Party (Venstre)	3
Total number of members:	25

Bø kommunestyre 1975–1979
Party name (in Nynorsk)	Number of representatives
Labour Party (Arbeidarpartiet)	9
Conservative Party (Høgre)	1
Christian Democratic Party (Kristeleg Folkeparti)	3
Centre Party (Senterpartiet)	4
Socialist Left Party (Sosialistisk Venstreparti)	1
Liberal Party (Venstre)	6
Cross-party list (Tverrpolitisk Liste)	1
Total number of members:	25

Bø kommunestyre 1971–1975
Party name (in Nynorsk)	Number of representatives
Labour Party (Arbeidarpartiet)	11
Christian Democratic Party (Kristeleg Folkeparti)	3
Centre Party (Senterpartiet)	4
Socialist People's Party (Sosialistisk Folkeparti)	1
Liberal Party (Venstre)	5
Local List(s) (Lokale lister)	1
Total number of members:	25

Bø kommunestyre 1967–1971
Party name (in Nynorsk)	Number of representatives
Labour Party (Arbeidarpartiet)	11
Conservative Party (Høgre)	1
Christian Democratic Party (Kristeleg Folkeparti)	2
Centre Party (Senterpartiet)	4
Socialist People's Party (Sosialistisk Folkeparti)	1
Liberal Party (Venstre)	6
Total number of members:	25

Bø kommunestyre 1963–1967
Party name (in Nynorsk)	Number of representatives
Labour Party (Arbeidarpartiet)	14
Conservative Party (Høgre)	1
Christian Democratic Party (Kristeleg Folkeparti)	2
Centre Party (Senterpartiet)	5
Liberal Party (Venstre)	3
Total number of members:	25

Bø heradsstyre 1959–1963
Party name (in Nynorsk)	Number of representatives
Labour Party (Arbeidarpartiet)	12
Christian Democratic Party (Kristeleg Folkeparti)	3
Centre Party (Senterpartiet)	6
Liberal Party (Venstre)	4
Total number of members:	25

Bø heradsstyre 1955–1959
Party name (in Nynorsk)	Number of representatives
Labour Party (Arbeidarpartiet)	12
Christian Democratic Party (Kristeleg Folkeparti)	3
Farmers' Party (Bondepartiet)	6
Liberal Party (Venstre)	4
Total number of members:	25

Bø heradsstyre 1951–1955
Party name (in Nynorsk)	Number of representatives
Labour Party (Arbeidarpartiet)	11
Christian Democratic Party (Kristeleg Folkeparti)	3
Farmers' Party (Bondepartiet)	5
Liberal Party (Venstre)	5
Total number of members:	24

Bø heradsstyre 1947–1951
Party name (in Nynorsk)	Number of representatives
Labour Party (Arbeidarpartiet)	10
Christian Democratic Party (Kristeleg Folkeparti)	3
Farmers' Party (Bondepartiet)	5
Liberal Party (Venstre)	6
Total number of members:	24

Bø heradsstyre 1945–1947
Party name (in Nynorsk)	Number of representatives
Labour Party (Arbeidarpartiet)	12
Christian Democratic Party (Kristeleg Folkeparti)	5
Farmers' Party (Bondepartiet)	3
Liberal Party (Venstre)	4
Total number of members:	24

Bø heradsstyre 1937–1941*
Party name (in Nynorsk)	Number of representatives
Labour Party (Arbeidarpartiet)	10
Farmers' Party (Bondepartiet)	5
Liberal Party (Venstre)	9
Total number of members:	24
Note: Due to the German occupation of Norway during World War II, no elections were held for new municipal councils until after the war ended in 1945.

=== Mayors ===
The mayor (Nynorsk: ordførar) of Bø Municipality was the political leader of the municipality and the chairperson of the municipal council. The following people have held this position:

- 1838–1841: Gjermund Halvorsen Eikjarud
- 1842–1852: Mattis Rye
- 1853–1853: Gjermund Halvorsen Eikjarud
- 1854–1855: Gunnulf Halvorsen Borgen
- 1856–1868: Søren Rollefsen
- 1868–1873: Halvor Clausen Eika
- 1874–1887: Halvor Nilsen Tvedten
- 1888–1891: Halvor K. Eika
- 1892–1895: Halvor H. Valen
- 1896–1898: Halvor T. Eika
- 1899–1915: Gjermund Nilsen Grivi (V)
- 1915–1919: Olav O. Stadskleiv (V)
- 1920–1922: Halvor E. Skogen (V)2
- 1923–1925: Neri Valen (V)
- 1926–1934: Anund K. Lovald (V)
- 1935–1940: Hans J. Verpe (V)
- 1946–1947: Olav K. Hagen (LL)
- 1948–1951: Anund K. Lovald (V)
- 1952–1955: Halvor H. Brenne (LL)
- 1956–1959: Svein Sperrud (LL)
- 1960–1963: Hans J. Sønstebø (Sp)
- 1964–1967: Hans Jubskås (LL)
- 1968–1971: Hallvard Eika (V)
- 1972–1975: Søren Høibø (V)
- 1976–1977: Olav Ødegård (V)
- 1978–1983: Asbjørn Josefsen (Ap)
- 1984–1991: Gunleik Hynne (Ap)
- 1991–1995: Asbjørn Josefsen (Ap)
- 1995–2011: Arne Storhaug (Ap)
- 2011–2019: Olav Kasland (V)

== Attractions ==
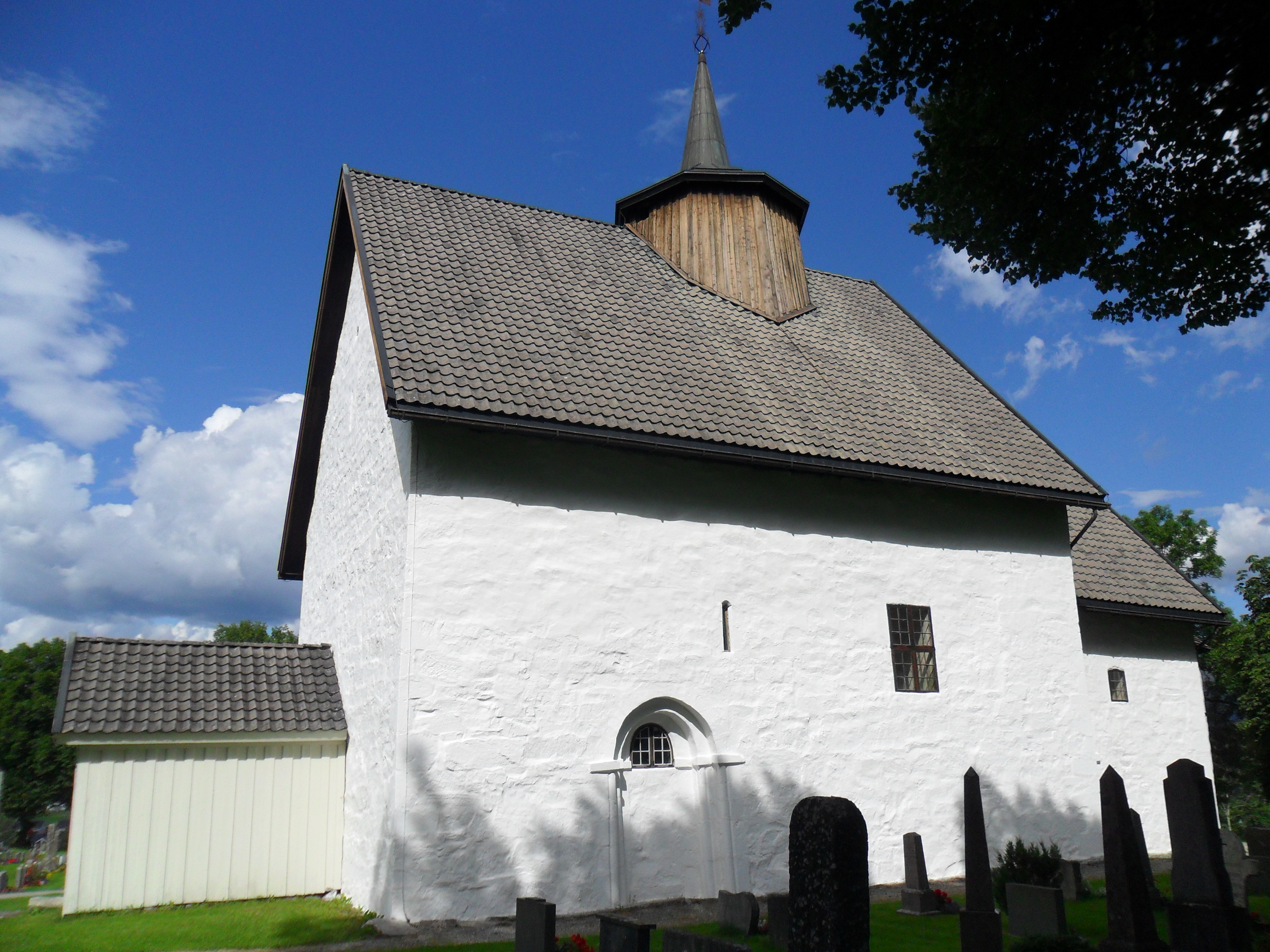
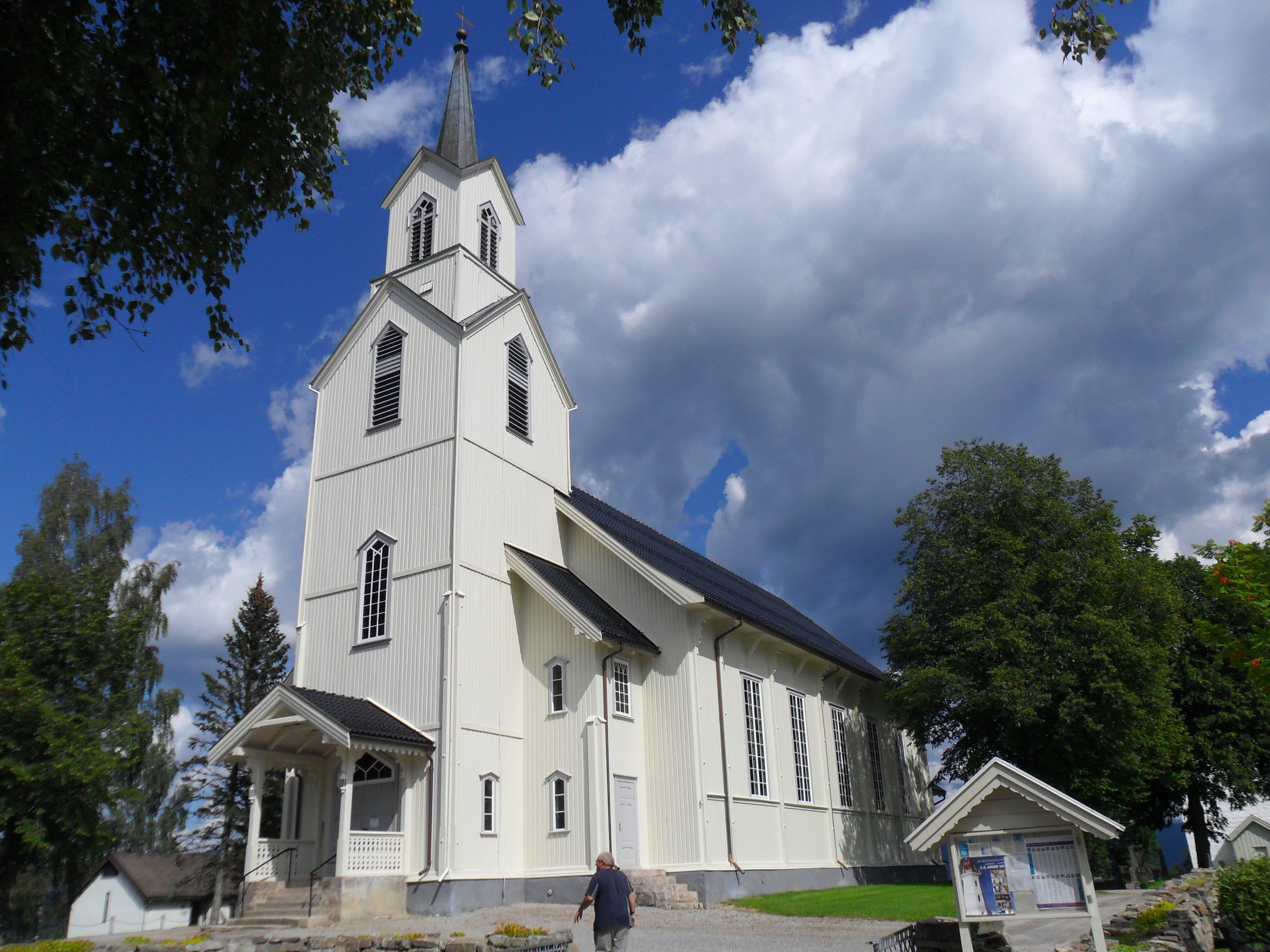
View of the Old Bø Church (left) and Bø Church (right)

Bø Municipality was famous for its waterpark Sommarland (the largest of its kind in Norway). Another tourist site in the municipality is the Gygrestol rock formation. There is also Kroa i bø, one of the oldest music venues in Norway. The club won the award for "Concert promoter of the Year 2005" and is based on voluntary work from students of the Telemark University College.

=== Old Bø Church ===
The Old Bø Church dates from around the year 1100. The church is in stone and has 200 seats. It was built in the Romanesque style, with long church plan and choir to the east. The sanctuary, choir loft and the apse are from the Middle Ages, whereas the narthex was built to the 1600s.

=== Bø Church ===
The new Bø Church dates from 1875. The church is wooden and has 450 seats. The church was built in Neo-Gothic style. There are wood carvings on the altarpiece, pulpit, lectern and west gallery.

== Gallery ==
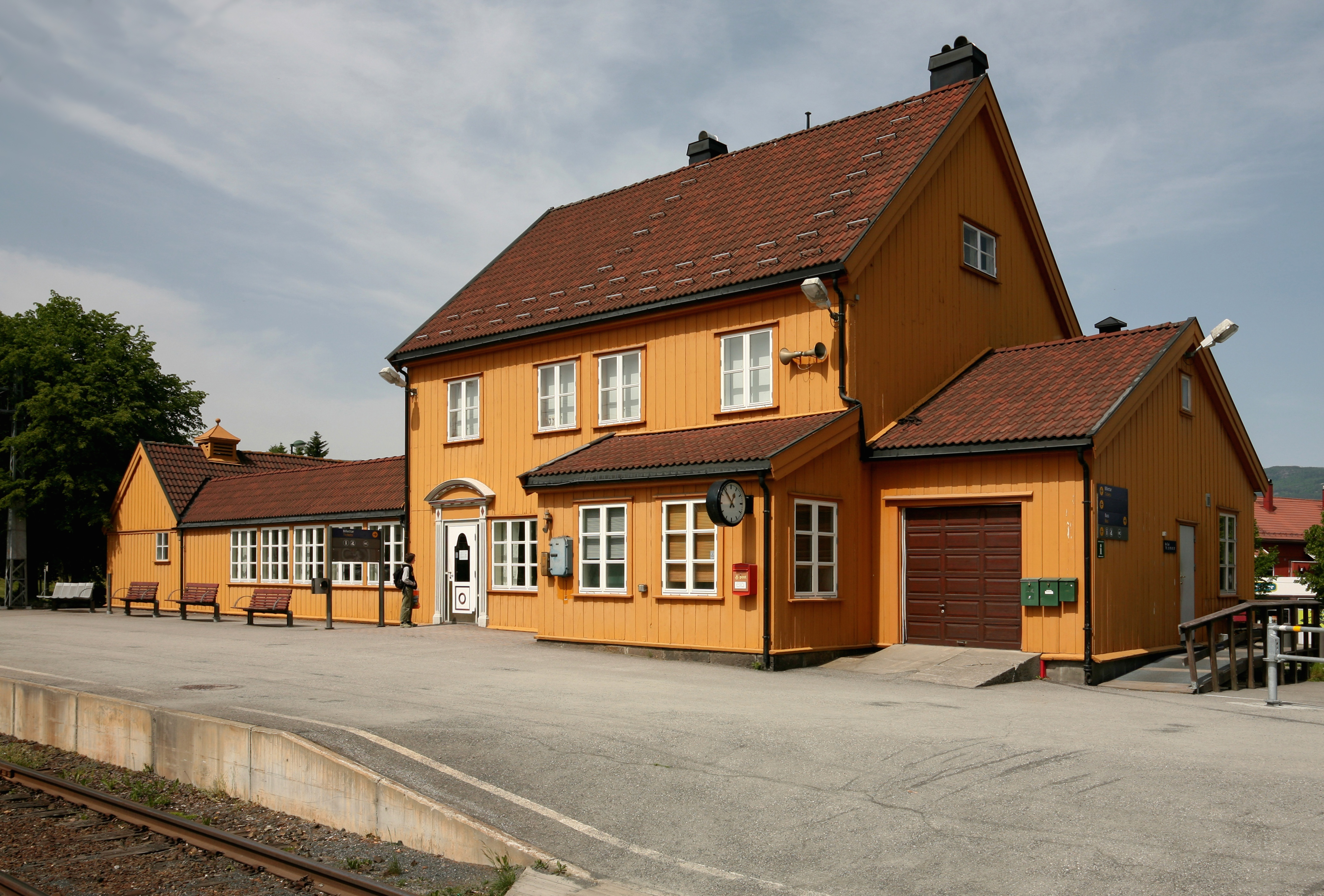
Bø Station

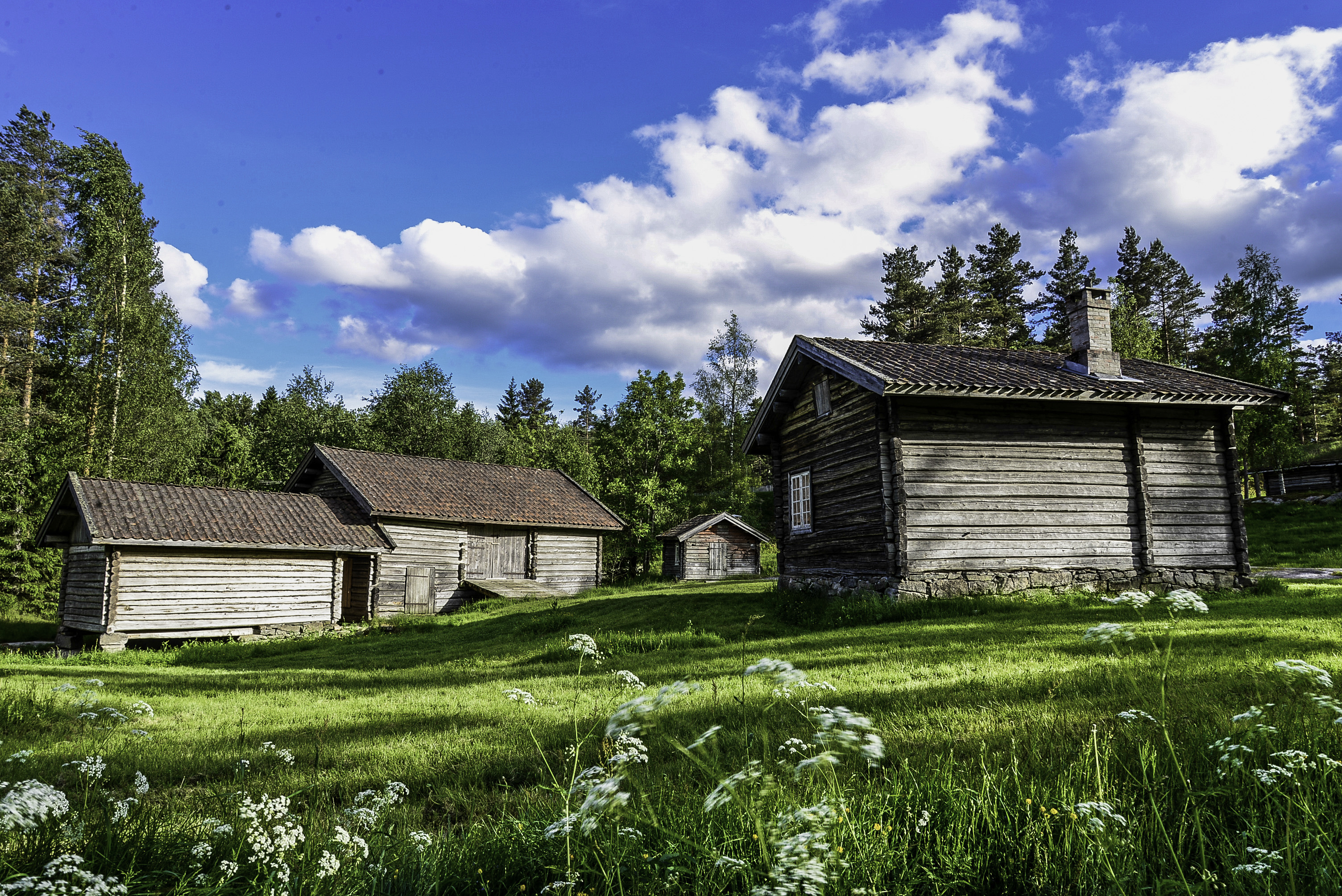
Mølleplassen

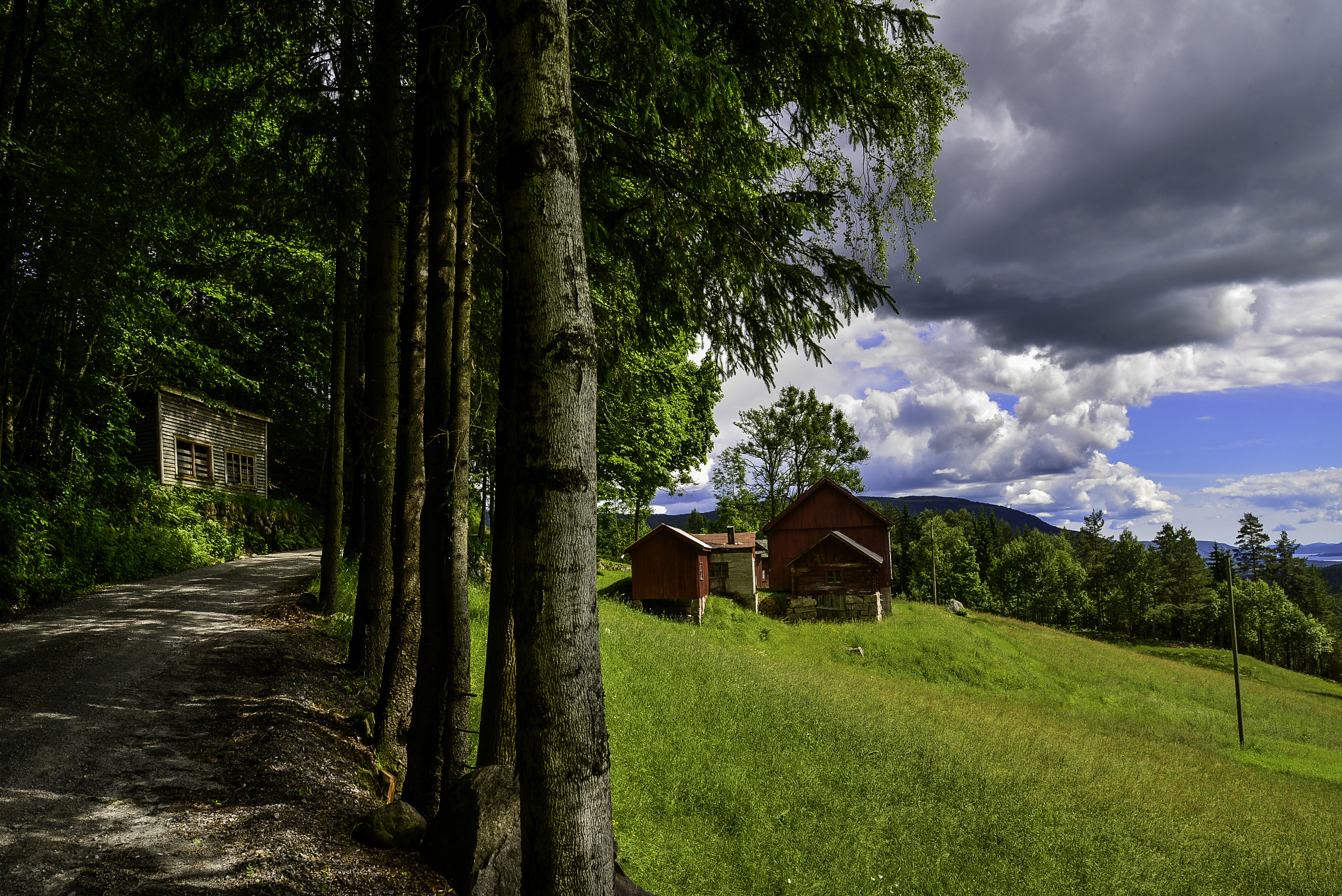
Farm in Bø

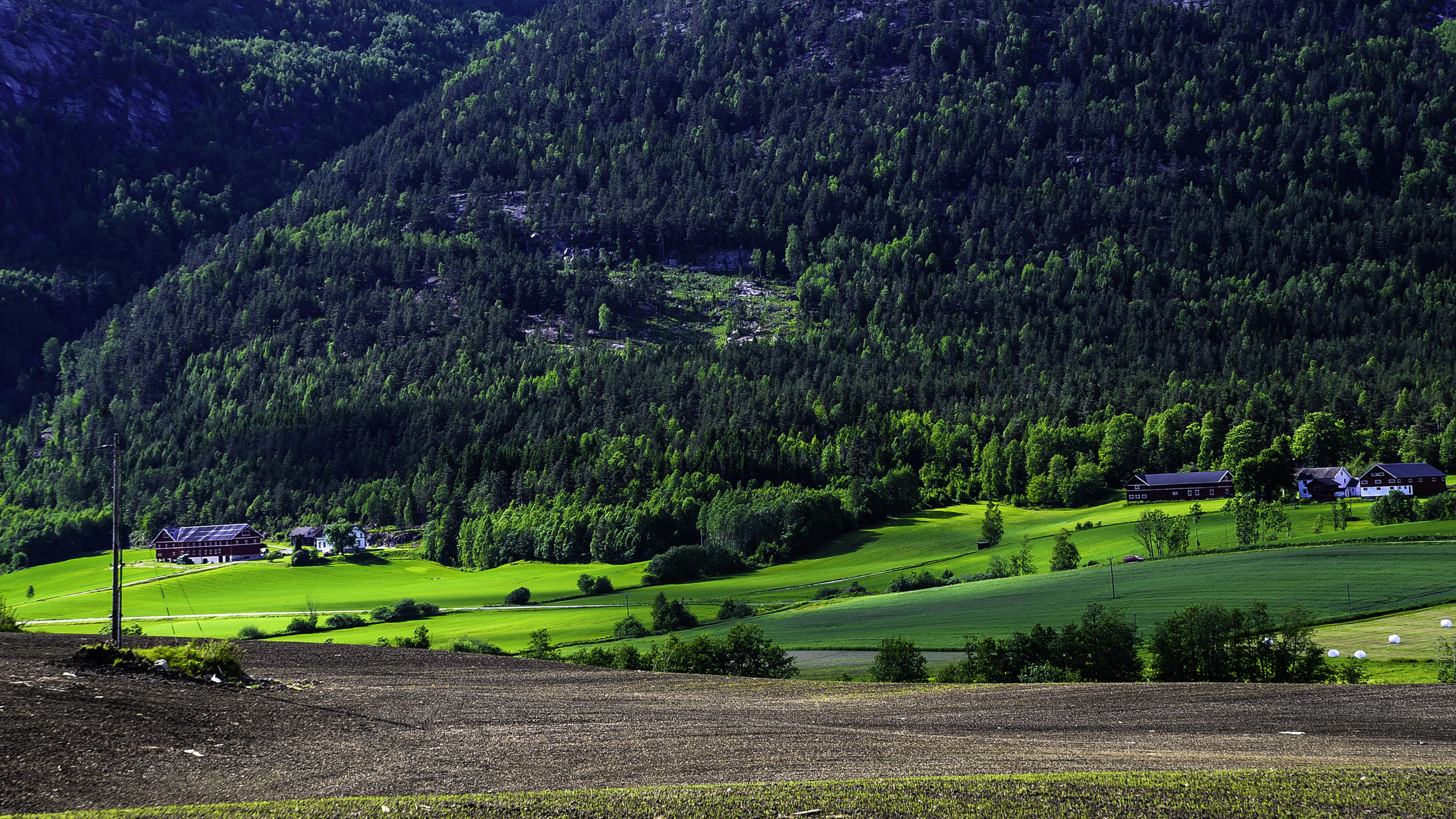
Farms in Bø

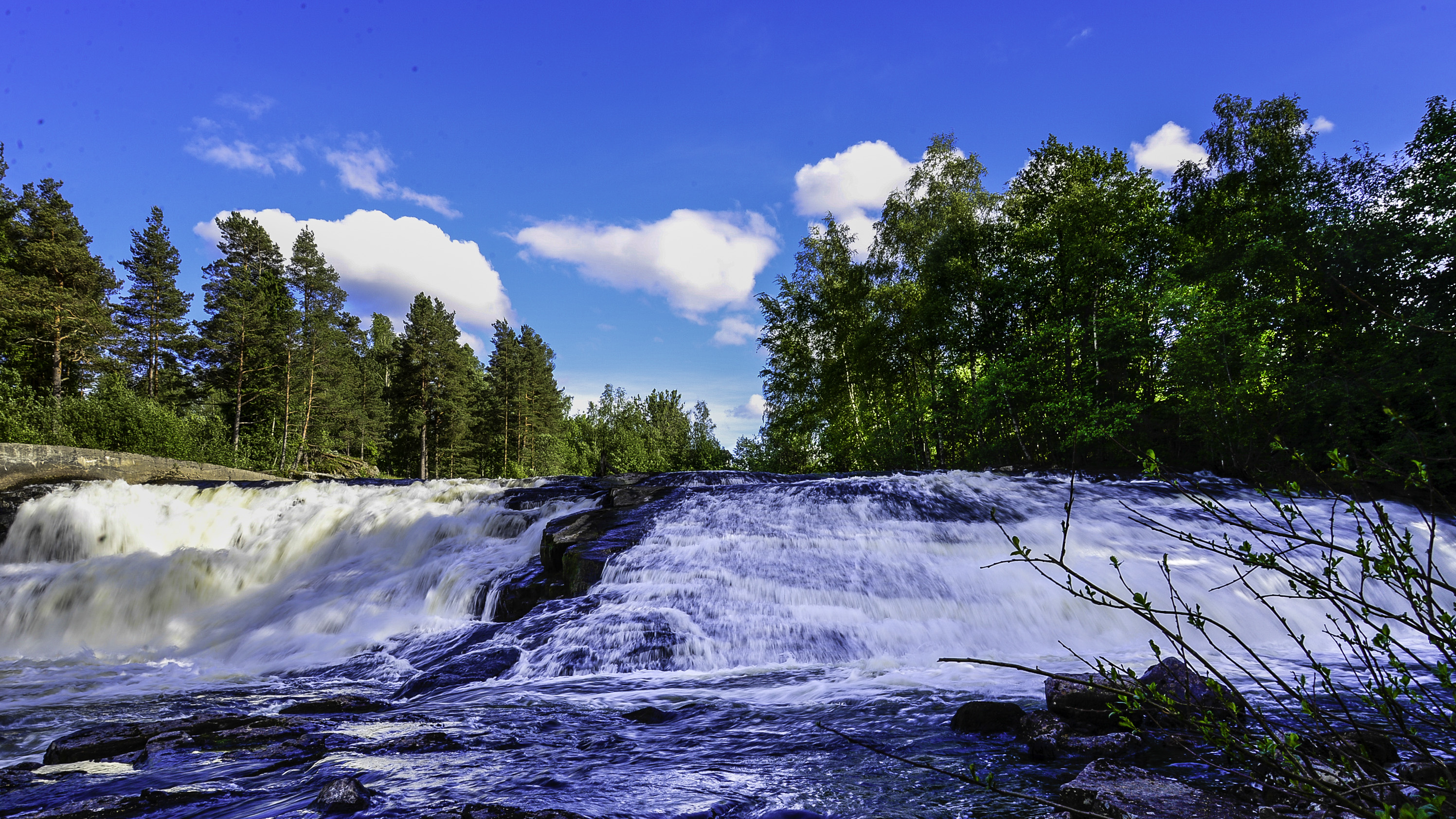
Oterholtfossen

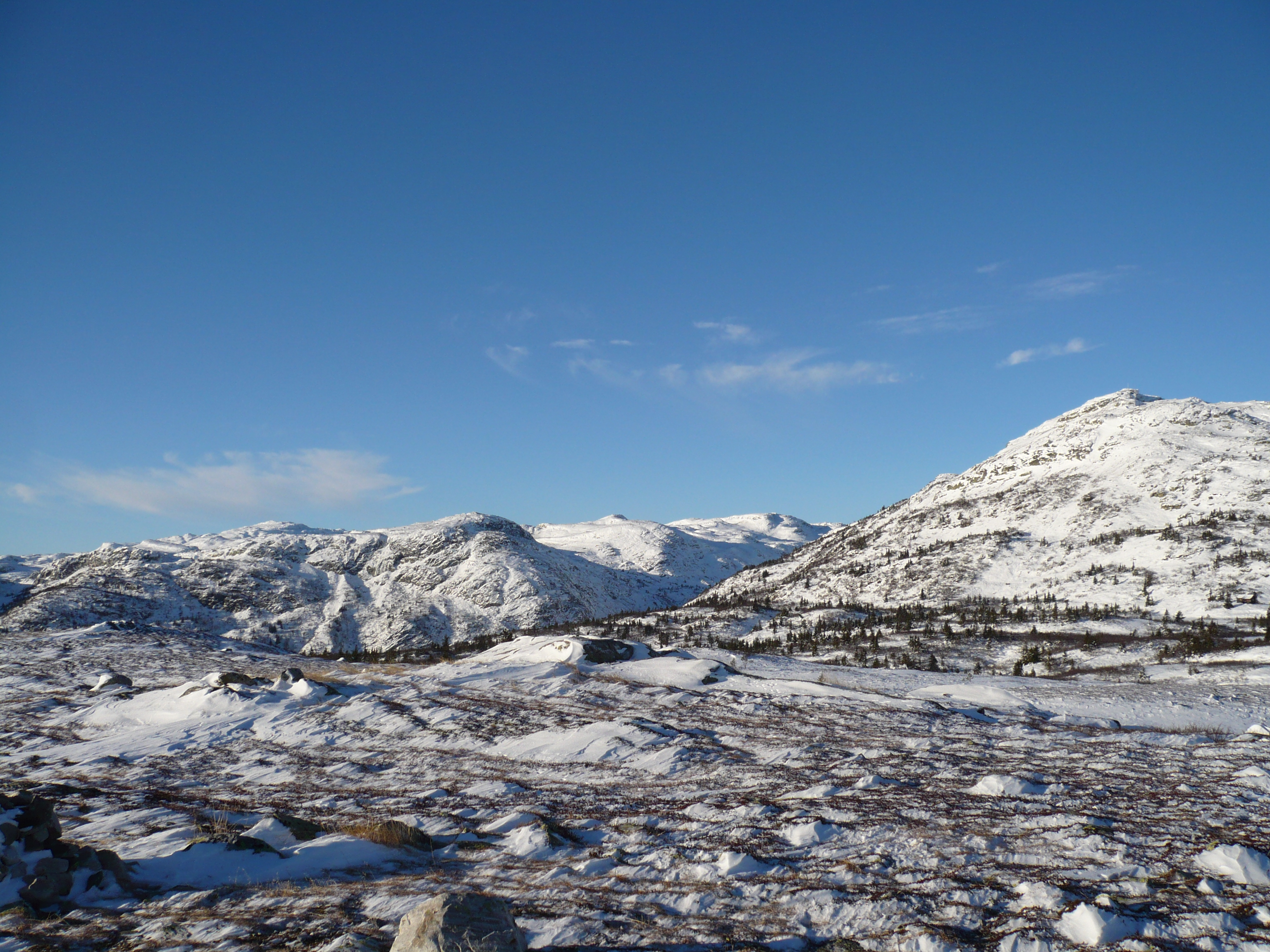
Lifjell

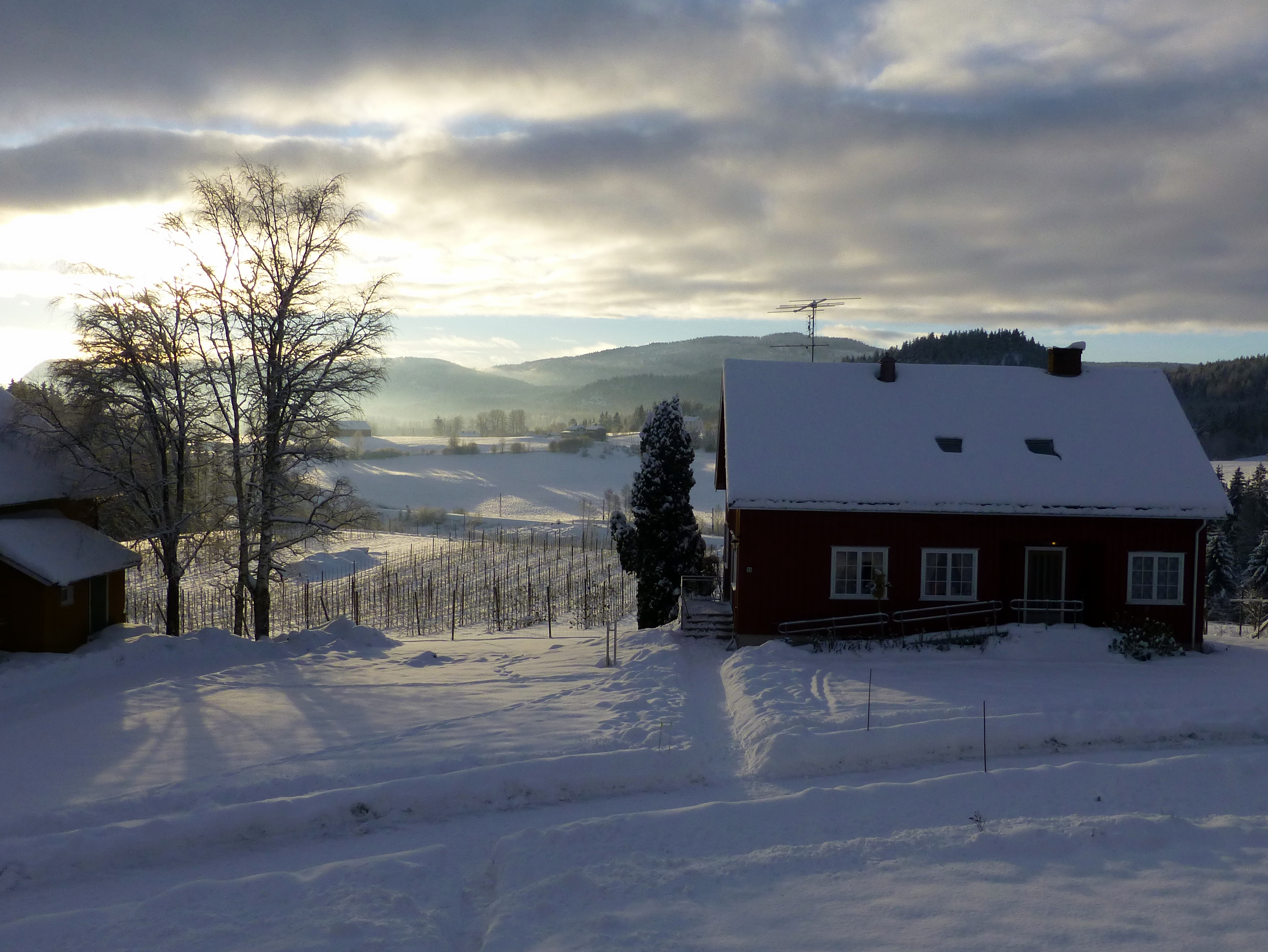
A typical farm house in Børte

== Sister cities ==
Bø has sister city agreements with the following places:

- Bengtsfors, Västra Götaland County, Sweden
- Puumala, Eastern Finland, Finland

== Notable people ==
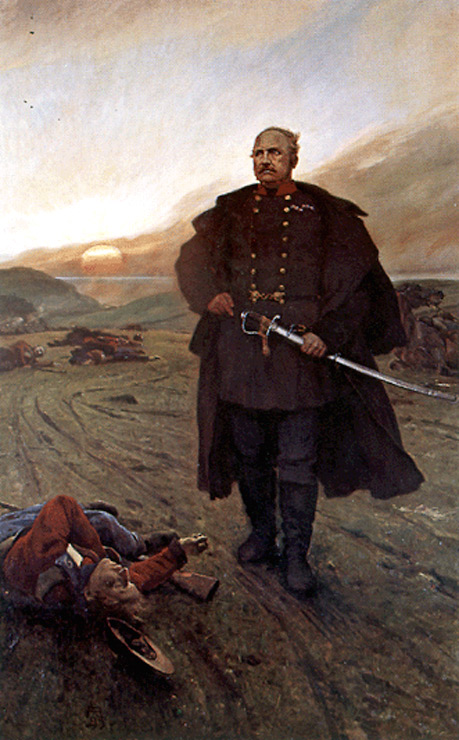
Rye Olaf, portrait from 1895

- Johan Henrik Rye (1787–1868), a military officer, jurist, and President of the Storting
- Jon Eriksson Helland (1790 in Bø – 1862), a Hardanger fiddle maker
- Olaf Rye (1791 in Bø – 1849), a Norwegian-Danish military officer
- Nils Nilsen Ronning (1870 in Bø – 1962), an American author, journalist, and editor
- Olav Gunnarsson Helland (1875 in Bø – 1946), a Norwegian Hardanger fiddle maker
- Neri Valen (1893 in Bø – 1954), a politician who was Mayor of Bø in 1922
- Halvor Vreim (1894 in Bø – 1966), an architect, saved old wooden buildings
- Olav Kielland (1901–1985 in Bø), a composer and conductor who lived in Bø from 1955
- Hallvard Eika (1920–1989), a politician who was Mayor of Bø from 1967–1970
- Halvor Kleppen (born 1947 in Bø), a media personality, theme park owner, and writer
- Geir Barvik (born 1958 in Bø), a civil servant who was the managing director of the Norwegian State Housing Bank until 2010
- Margunn Bjørnholt (born 1958 in Bø), a sociologist, economist, and academic
- John-Arne Røttingen (born 1969 in Bø), a medical scientist who was CEO of the Research Council of Norway
- Varg Vikernes (born 1973), a musician, writer, and convicted murderer who lived in Bø after his release from prison
- Øyvind Storesund (born 1975 in Bø), a rock and jazz musician who plays the upright bass
- Håkon Anton Fagerås, (grew up in Bø), a sculptor
- Webjørn S. Espeland, (Norwegian Wiki) (born 1979 in Bø), a radio personality

=== Sport ===
- Anders Haugen (1888 in Bø – 1984), an American ski jumper bronze medallist at the 1924 Winter Olympics
- Hans Kleppen (1907 in Bø – 2009), a ski jumper who participated in the 1928 Winter Olympics
- Runar Steinstad (born 1967 in Bø), a paralympian athlete and bronze medallist at the 2012 Summer Paralympics
- Elbasan Rashani (born 1993), a Kosovan professional footballer with over 200 club caps who grew up in Bø

== See also ==
- List of former municipalities of Norway
