= Bø Church =

Bø Church may refer to several places:

- Bø Church (Hyllestad), a church in Hyllestad municipality, Sogn og Fjordane county, Norway
- Bø Church (Nordland), a church in Bø municipality, Nordland county, Norway
- Bø Church (Telemark), a church in Bø municipality, Telemark county, Norway
- Old Bø Church, a historic church in Bø municipality, Telemark county, Norway
