= Storhaug (surname) =

Storhaug is a surname. Notable people with the surname include:

- Åge Storhaug (1938–2012), Norwegian gymnast
- Arne Storhaug (born 1950), Norwegian politician
- Hans Storhaug (1915–1995), Norwegian resistance member
- Hege Storhaug (born 1962), Norwegian journalist, author and political activist
- Lars Storhaug (born 1935), Norwegian farmer and politician
