= Bø, Midt-Telemark =

Village in Midt-Telemark Municipality, Norway

Bø Bø i Telemark
- Village
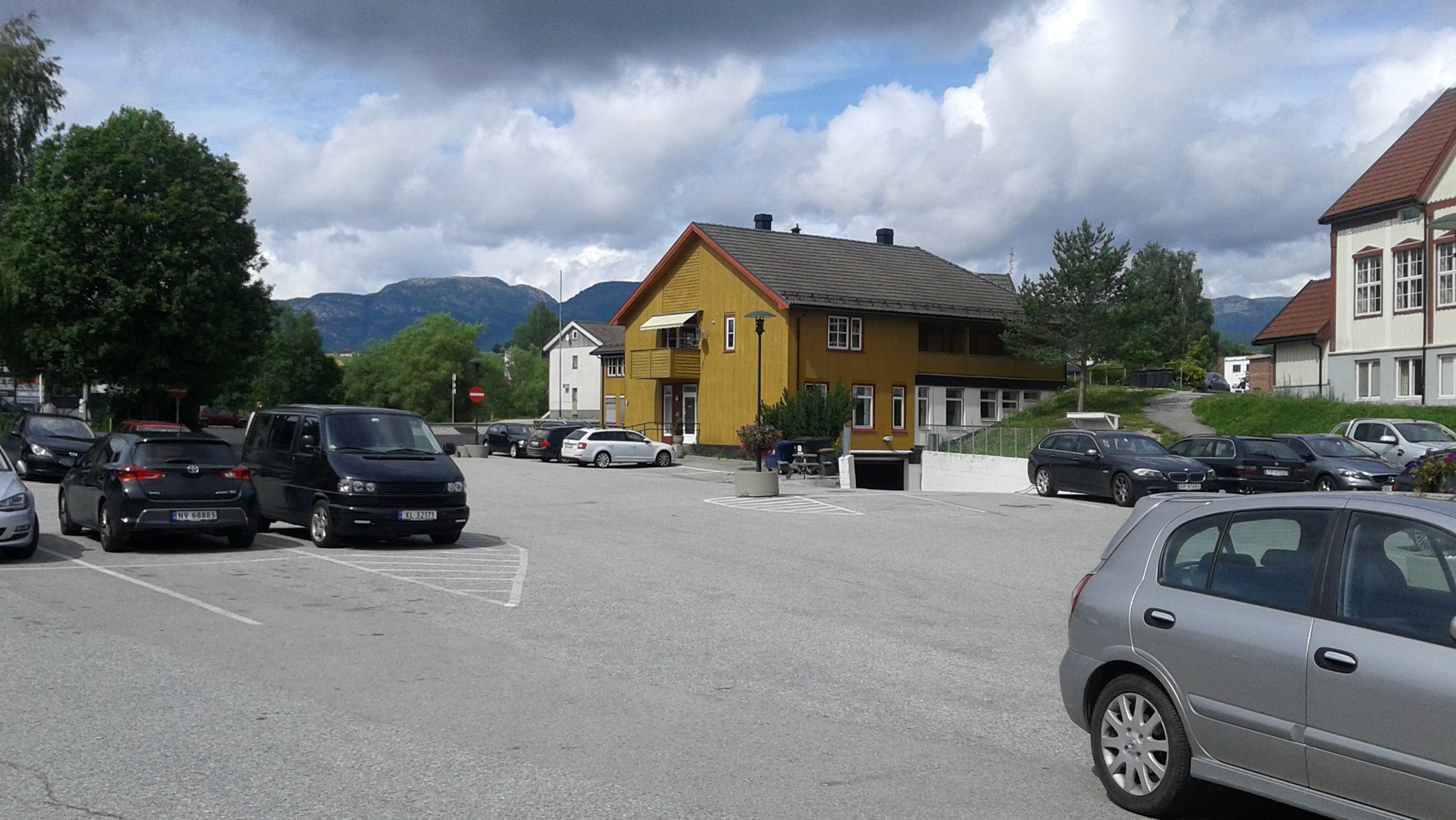
- View of the village
- Interactive map of Bø
- Coordinates: 59.41299°N 9.0693°E
- Country: Norway
- Region: Eastern Norway
- County: Telemark
- District: Aust-Telemark
- Municipality: Midt-Telemark Municipality

Area
  - Total: 3.34 km^{2} (1.29 sq mi)
- Elevation: 67 m (220 ft)

Population (2025)
  - Total: 3,968
  - Density: 1,188/km^{2} (3,080/sq mi)
- Time zone: UTC+01:00 (CET)
  - Summer (DST): UTC+02:00 (CEST)
- Post Code: 3801 Bø i Telemark

Bø or Bø i Telemark is the administrative centre of Midt-Telemark Municipality in Telemark county, Norway. The village is located along the river Bøelva, about half-way between the large lakes Seljordsvatnet and Norsjø. It is located about 2.5 kilometres (1.6 mi) south of the village of Folkestad, about 6 kilometres (3.7 mi) northwest of the village of Gvarv, and about 15 kilometres (9.3 mi) north of the village of Bjervamoen. The small village of Nordbøåsane lies about 2.5 kilometres (1.6 mi) east of the village.

The 3.34-square-kilometre (830-acre) village has a population (2025) of 3,968 and a population density of 1,188 inhabitants per square kilometre (3,080/sq mi).

The Norwegian National Road 36 and the Sørlandsbanen railway line both pass through the village. Both the Bø Church and the Old Bø Church are located in the village.

== History ==
The village was also the administrative centre of the old Bø Municipality which existed from 1838 until 2020 (when it became part of Midt-Telemark Municipality).
