= Halvor Vreim =

Norwegian architect (1894–1966)

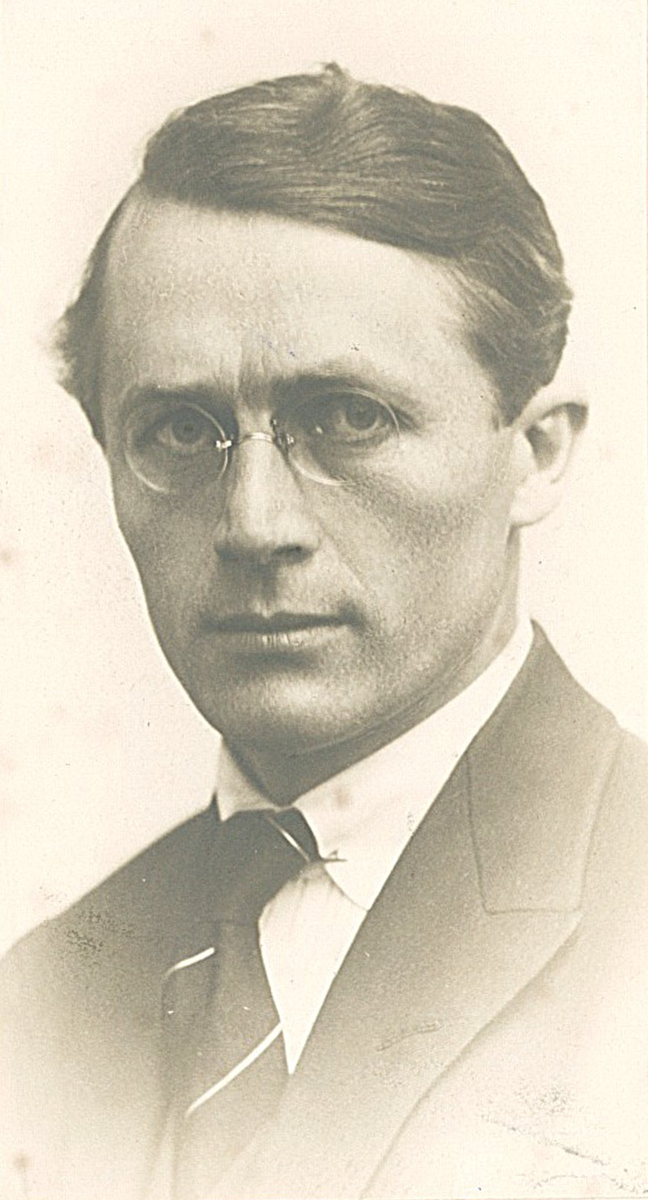
- Vreim ca. 1910
- Born: 12 August 1894; Bø Municipality, Norway
- Died: 6 February 1966 (aged 71)
- Occupation: architect
- Awards: Order of St. Olav

Halvor Vreim (12 August 1894 – 6 February 1966) was a Norwegian architect who contributed to the documentation, conservation and restoration of old wooden buildings.

== Personal life ==
Vreim was born in Bø Municipality to farmer Gunnar Helgeson Vreim and Anne Jonsdotter Li. In 1930 he married Anna Bonli.

== Career ==
Vreim started his career as a carpenter, and also studied theoretical and historical aspects of the profession. He was appointed at the Norwegian Museum of Cultural History from 1920, and at the Norwegian Directorate for Cultural Heritage from 1937 to 1964. He was approved as architect, and a member of the Association of Norwegian Architects from 1936. His works include Norwegian Decorative Art To-day from 1937, Norsk trearkitektur from 1939, and Laftehus from 1940. He was decorated Knight, First Class of the Order of St. Olav in 1963. He died in Oslo in 1966.
