= Nordbøåsane =

Village in Midt-Telemark Municipality, Norway

- Village
- Interactive map of Nordbøåsane
- Coordinates: 59.40384°N 9.0227°E
- Country: Norway
- Region: Eastern Norway
- County: Telemark
- District: Aust-Telemark
- Municipality: Midt-Telemark Municipality

Area
  - Total: 0.28 km^{2} (0.11 sq mi)
- Elevation: 195 m (640 ft)

Population (2025)
  - Total: 419
  - Density: 1,496/km^{2} (3,870/sq mi)
- Time zone: UTC+01:00 (CET)
  - Summer (DST): UTC+02:00 (CEST)
- Post Code: 3803 Bø i Telemark

Nordbøåsane is a village in Midt-Telemark Municipality in Telemark county, Norway. The village is located about 2.5 kilometres (1.6 mi) to the west of the village of Bø. The Norwegian National Road 36 passes just north of the village.

The 0.28-square-kilometre (69-acre) village has a population (2025) of 419 and a population density of 1,496 inhabitants per square kilometre (3,870/sq mi).
