= Arne Storhaug =

Norwegian politician (born 1950)

Arne Storhaug (born 27 September 1950) is a Norwegian politician for the Labour Party.

He served as a deputy representative to the Norwegian Parliament from Telemark during the terms 2001–2005 and 2005–2009.

On the local level Storhaug was the mayor of Bø Municipality from 1995 until 2011.
