= Folkestad, Midt-Telemark =

Village in Midt-Telemark Municipality, Norway

Folkestad
- Village
- Interactive map of Folkestad
- Coordinates: 59.43574°N 9.06977°E
- Country: Norway
- Region: Eastern Norway
- County: Telemark
- District: Aust-Telemark
- Municipality: Midt-Telemark Municipality

Area
  - Total: 0.82 km^{2} (0.32 sq mi)
- Elevation: 116 m (381 ft)

Population (2025)
  - Total: 436
  - Density: 532/km^{2} (1,380/sq mi)
- Time zone: UTC+01:00 (CET)
  - Summer (DST): UTC+02:00 (CEST)
- Post Code: 3804 Bø i Telemark

Folkestad is a village in Midt-Telemark Municipality in Telemark county, Norway. The village is located about 3 kilometres (1.9 mi) north of the village of Bø, which is the municipal centre.

The 0.82-square-kilometre (200-acre) village has a population (2025) of 436 and a population density of 532 inhabitants per square kilometre (1,380/sq mi).
