= Kroa i bø =

Coordinates: 59°24′29″N 9°03′33″E

Kroa i Bø is a concert venue and a student house run mainly by volunteers made up of students of Telemark University College (TUC) (Norwegian: Høgskolen i Telemark - HiT) in Bø, Norway.

== History ==
Established in 1971 under the name Kro & Velferd as a student welfare association with the purpose to give the local students something fun to do in their spare time. The association changed name to Kro & Kultur and focused on parties and concerts with both Norwegian and international artists in different temporary locations around Bø. The name Kroa i Bø were loosely used about the association until 1985 when the students were given a former trailer garage and the house was named Kroa i Bø. The association who's running the house is still called "Kro & Kultur", but as a whole the name "Kroa i Bø" is almost always used.

The venue won the prize for "Concert Promoter of the Year 2005" (Norwegian: Årets Konsertarrangør 2005), a prize given by the organization for local promoters in Norway, Norsk Rockforbund.

It is the official student house for the college students in Bø and has activities like a student paper, student radio, film club and many others. It has only one steady employee, which is the daily administrator, but some 100-150 volunteers. Only open in the school semesters between August and December, and January through May.

== Artists ==
Artists who played in the school year of 2007/08 includes known acts like Ash (IRL), Kaizers Orchestra, Madcon, Kurt Nilsen, Raga Rockers, Timbuktu (S), The Grand, Dog Almighty and Hellbillies.
