= Bø Church (Telemark) =

Church in Telemark, Norway

- Bø kyrkje
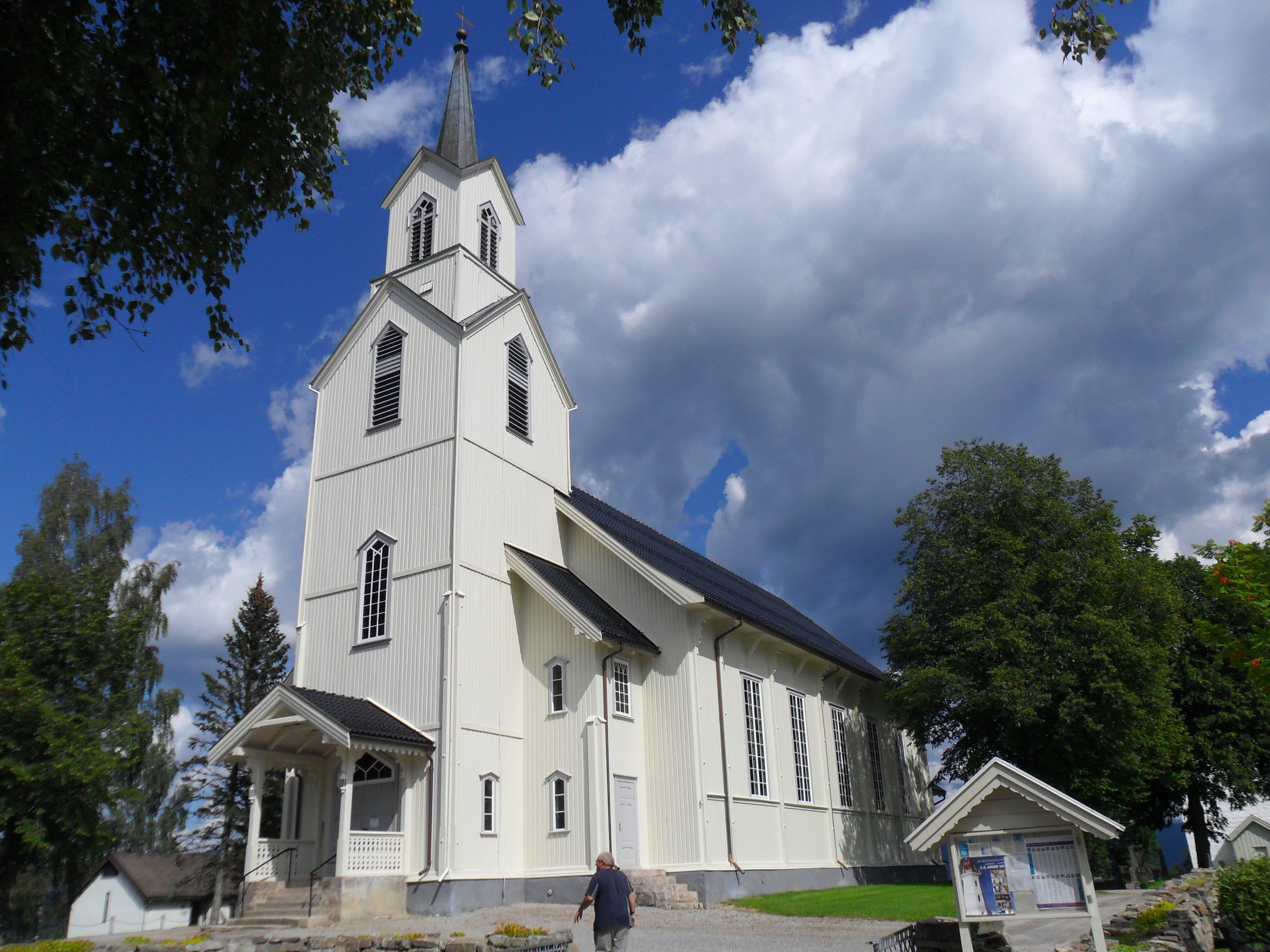
- View of the church
- Bø Church
- 59°24′40″N 9°03′18″E
- Location: Midt-Telemark Municipality, Telemark
- Country: Norway
- Denomination: Church of Norway
- Churchmanship: Evangelical Lutheran

History
- Status: Parish church

Architecture
- Functional status: Active
- Architect: Jacob Wilhelm Nordan
- Architectural type: Long church
- Completed: 1875 (151 years ago)

Specifications
- Capacity: 450
- Materials: Wood

Administration
- Diocese: Agder og Telemark
- Deanery: Øvre Telemark prosti
- Parish: Bø
- Norwegian Cultural Heritage Site
- Type: Church
- Status: Listed
- ID: 83994

Bø Church (Norwegian: Bø kyrkje) is a parish church of the Church of Norway in Midt-Telemark Municipality in Telemark county, Norway. It is located in the village of Bø. It is the main church for the Bø parish which is part of the Øvre Telemark prosti (deanery) in the Diocese of Agder og Telemark. The white, wooden church was built in a long church design in 1875 using plans drawn up by the architect Jacob Wilhelm Nordan. The church seats about 450 people.

== History ==
The Old Bø Church was used for centuries by the people of Bø. By the mid-1800s, the old church was in seriously bad shape. There were structural problems that were threatening the building, in addition to the fact that the old church was much smaller than it should be for the size of the parish. It was then decided to build a new church to replace the old building. Designs for the new church were drawn by Jacob Wilhelm Nordan and it was decided to build the new church on the west side of the present churchyard, about 75 metres (246 ft) to the northwest of the old church. The new church was built in 1874-1875 and it was consecrated in 1875. After this, the Old Bø Church was closed and no longer used (later the old church was restored and preserved for history).

== Media gallery ==
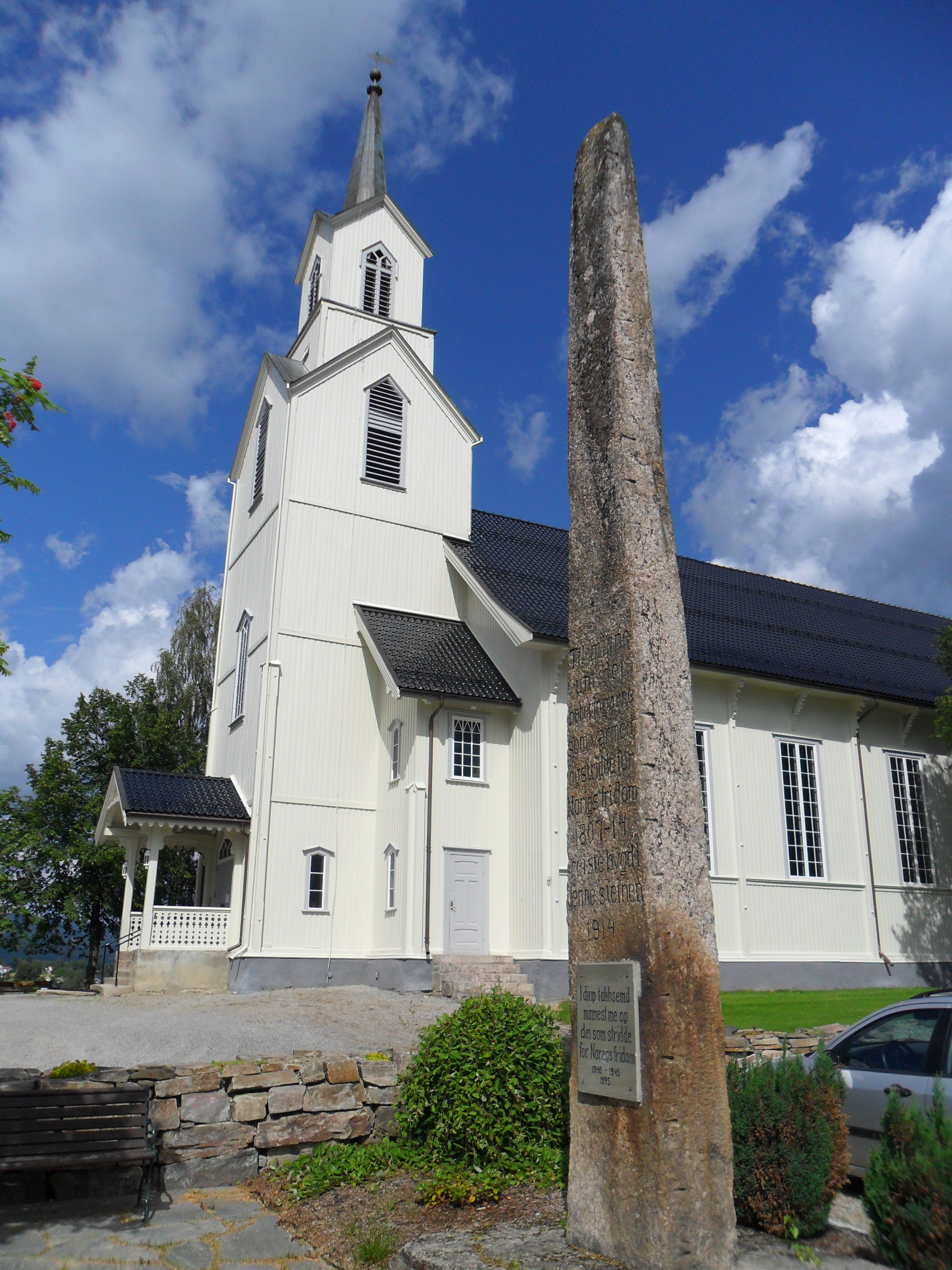
The monument in honor of fighters for the freedom of Norway

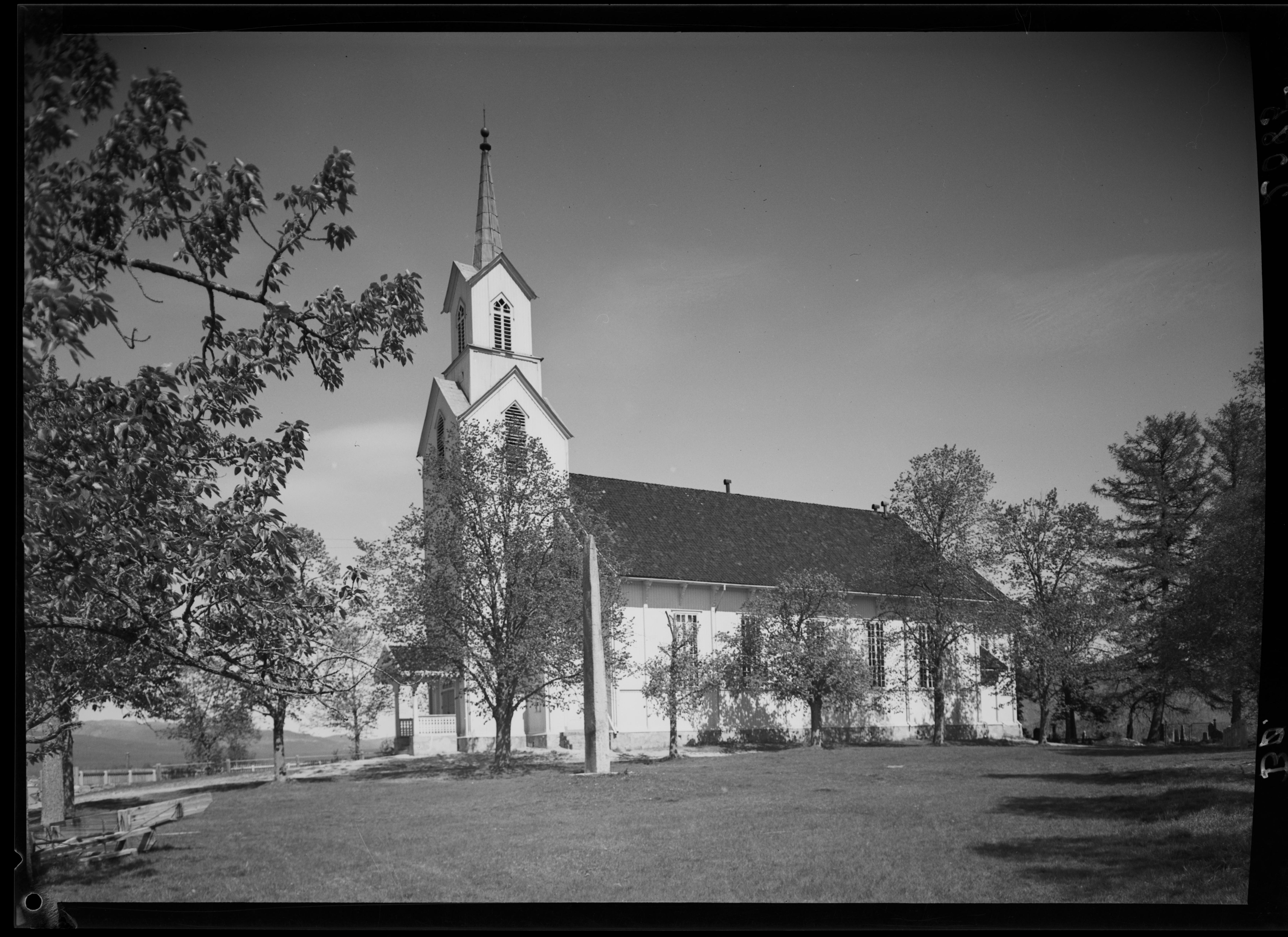

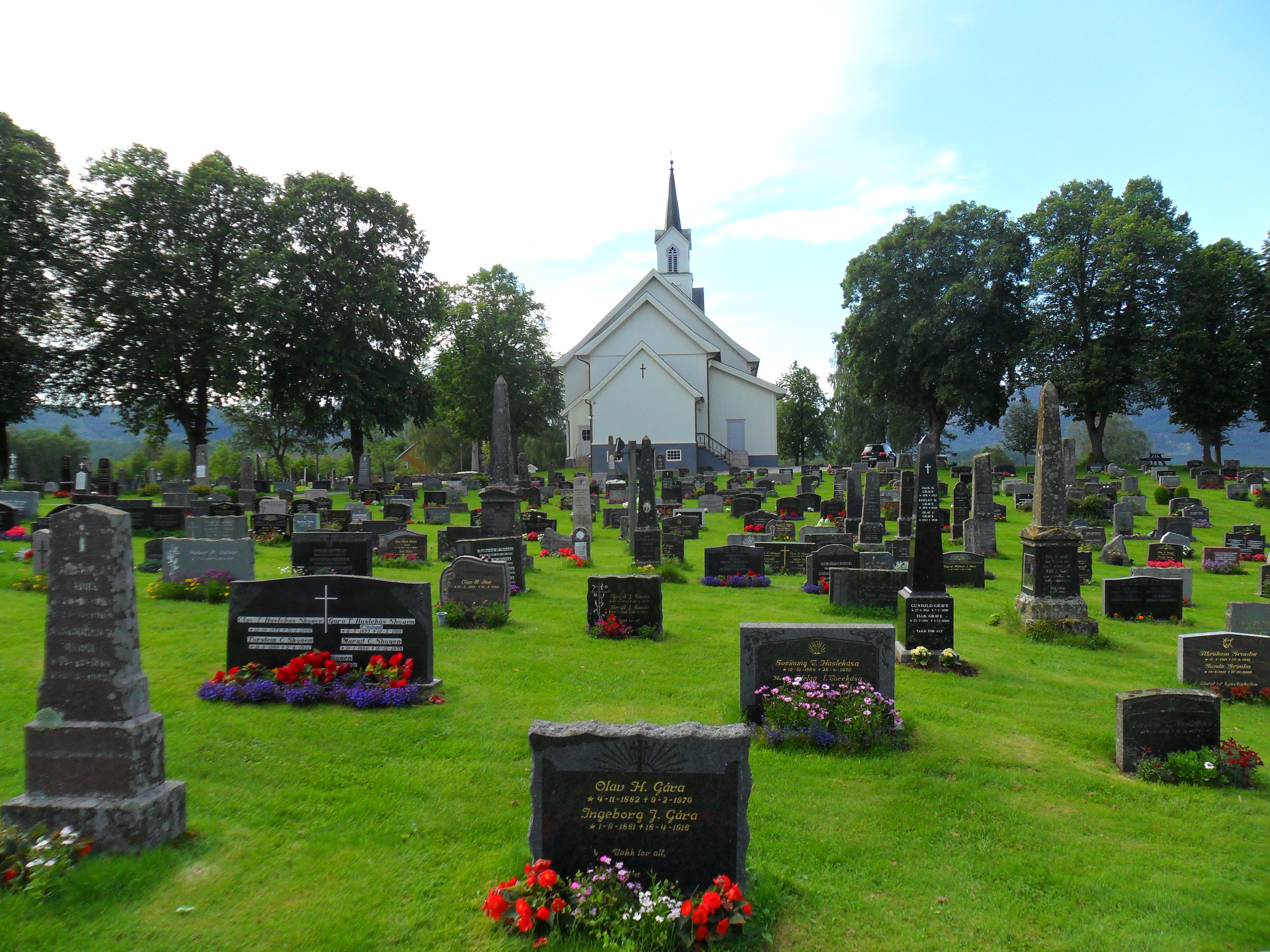
The cemetery

Both the old and the new churches in Bø in a snow storm

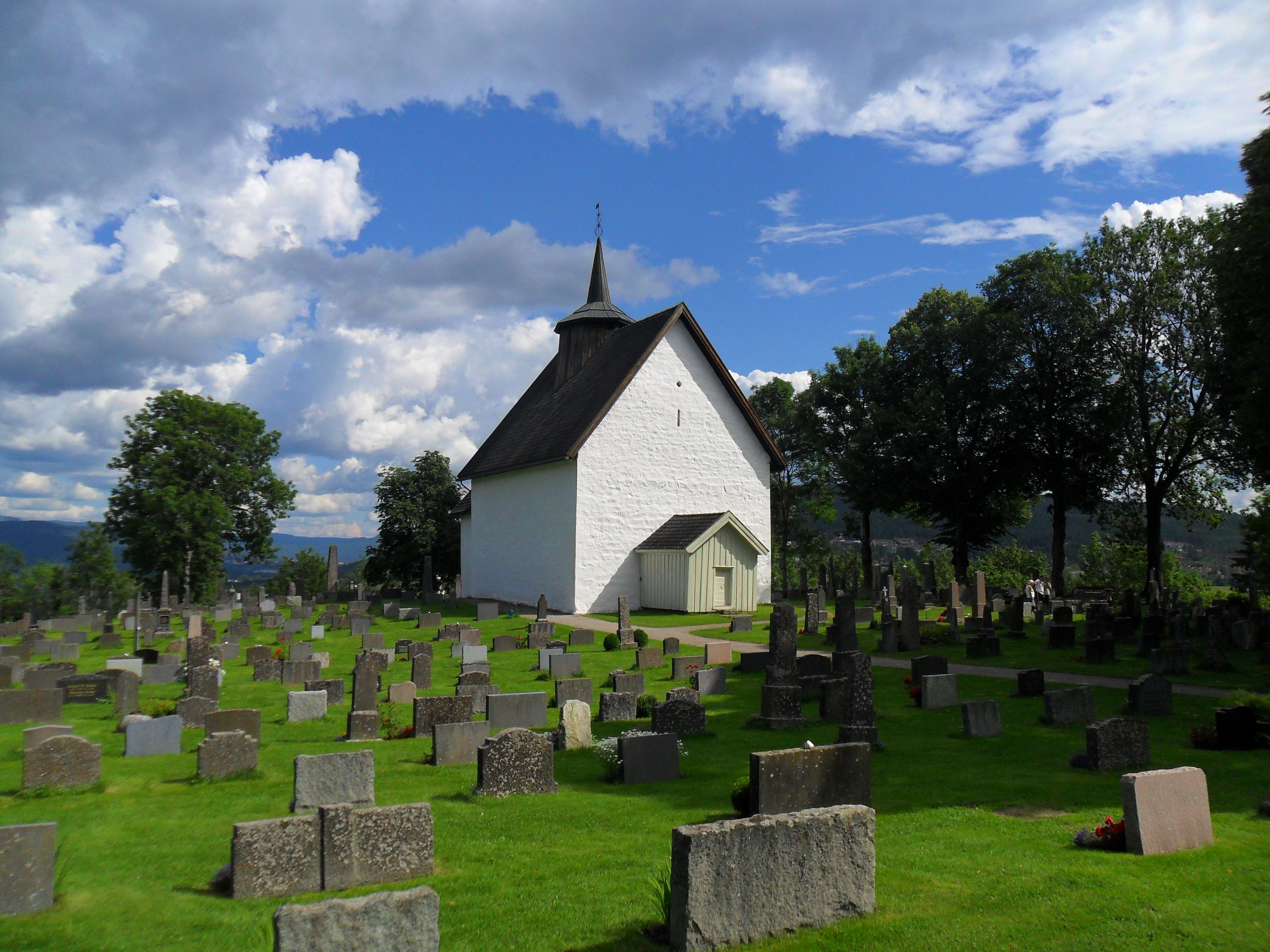
View of the Old Bø Church on the other side of the cemetery

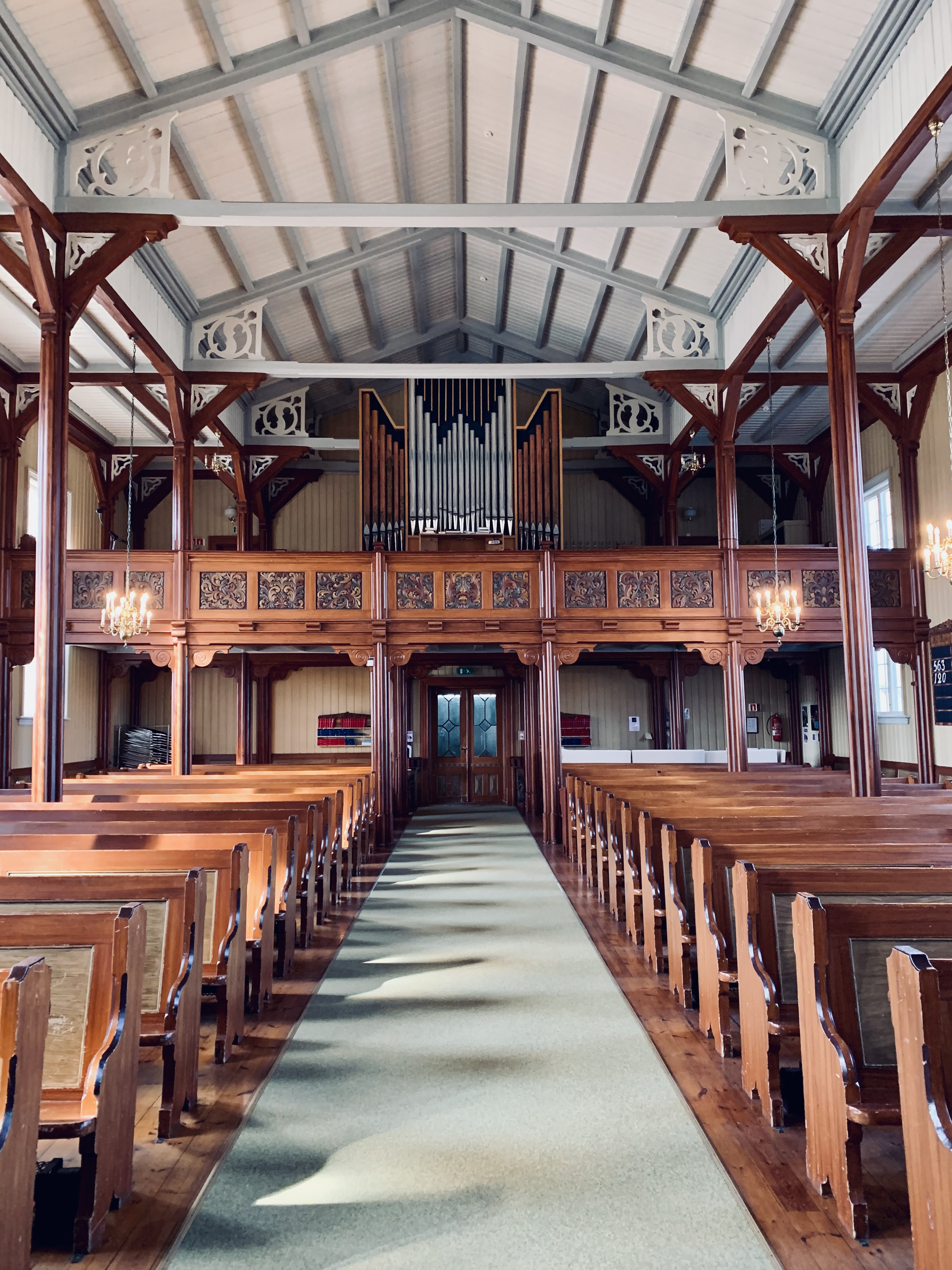
The view from the altar

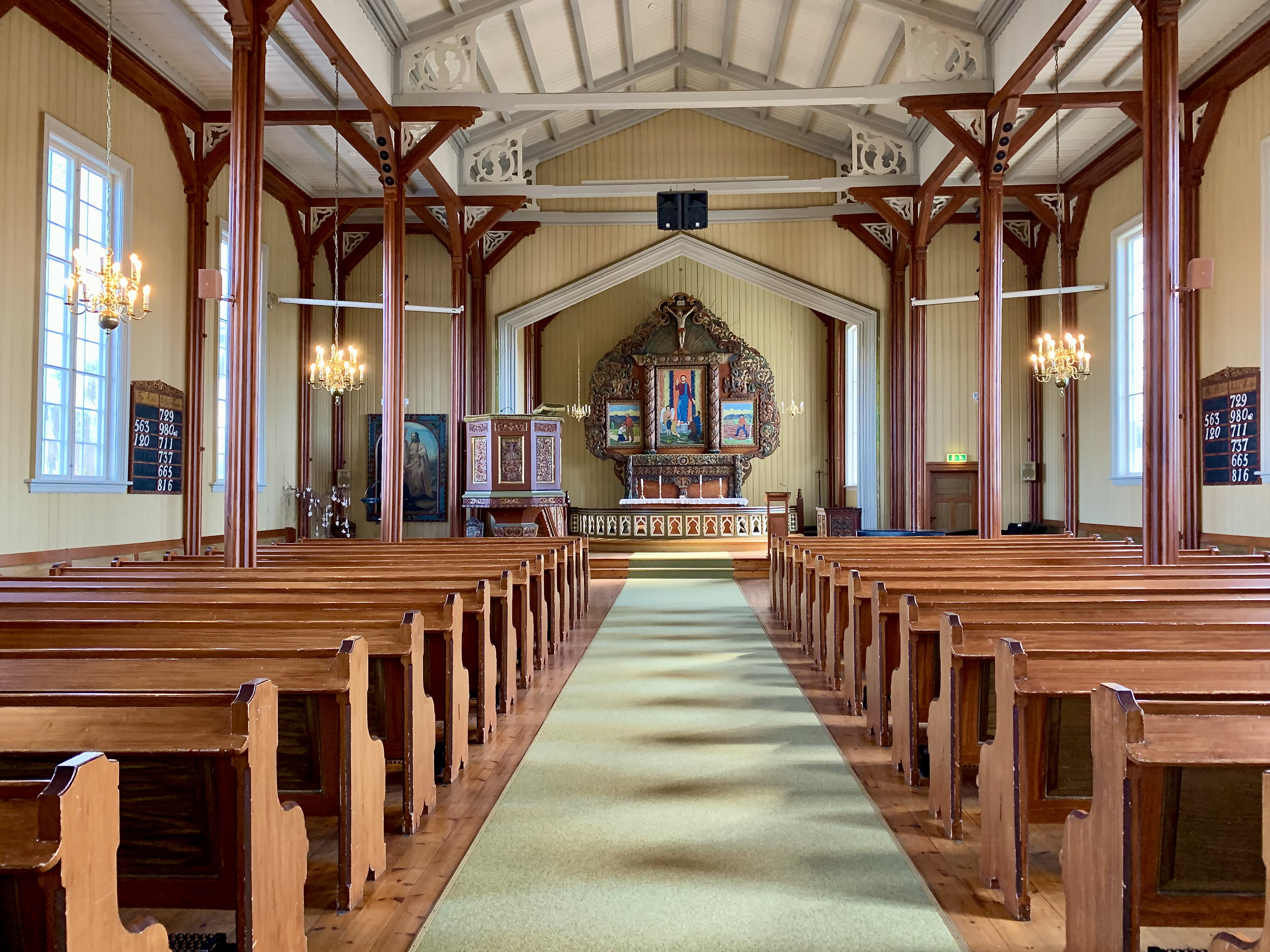
View from the entry

== See also ==
- List of churches in Agder og Telemark
