= Old Bø Church =

Church in Telemark, Norway

- Bø gamle kyrkje
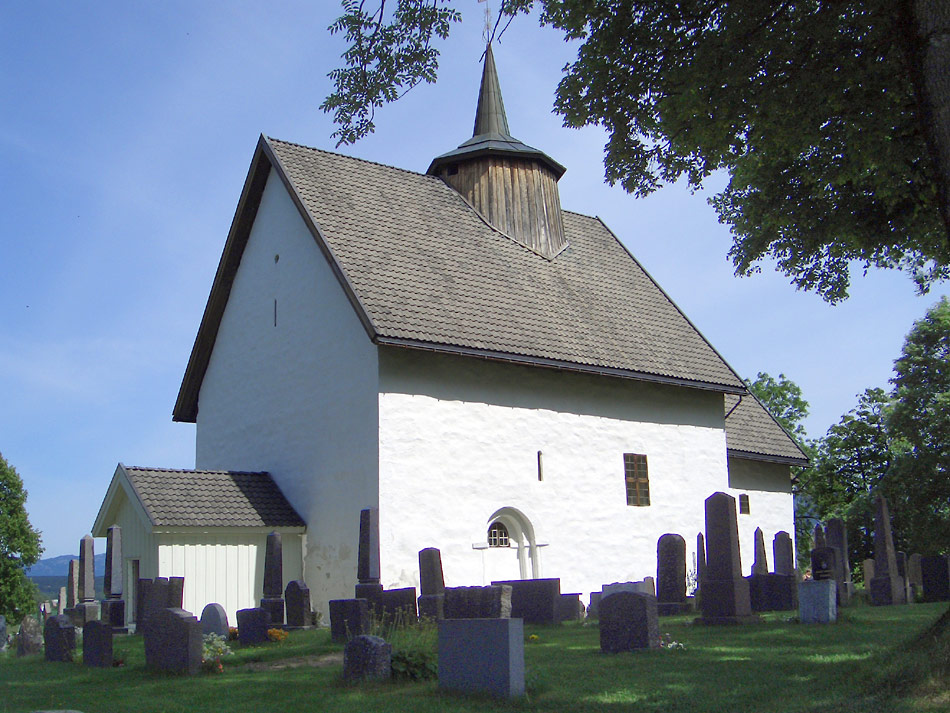
- View of the church
- Old Bø Church
- 59°24′40″N 9°03′22″E
- Location: Midt-Telemark Municipality, Telemark
- Country: Norway
- Denomination: Church of Norway
- Previous denomination: Catholic Church
- Churchmanship: Evangelical Lutheran

History
- Status: Parish church
- Founded: 11th century
- Consecrated: 12th century

Architecture
- Functional status: Preserved church
- Architectural type: Long church
- Completed: 1179 (847 years ago)
- Closed: 1875

Specifications
- Capacity: 150
- Materials: Stone

Administration
- Diocese: Agder og Telemark
- Deanery: Øvre Telemark prosti
- Parish: Bø
- Norwegian Cultural Heritage Site
- Type: Church
- Status: Automatically protected
- ID: 83992

Old Bø Church (Norwegian: Bø gamle kyrkje) is a former parish church of the Church of Norway in Midt-Telemark Municipality in Telemark county, Norway. It is located in the village of Bø. It used to be the main church for the Bø parish which is part of the Øvre Telemark prosti (deanery) in the Diocese of Agder og Telemark. The white, stone church was built in a long church design around the year 1179 using plans drawn up by an unknown architect. The church seats about 150 people. This church was closed in 1875 when the new Bø Church was opened. This church is now preserved as a museum.

== History ==
The first church in Bø was likely a small wooden post church that was built during the 12th century. This church stood on the same site as the present building. The remains of this church were found during some archaeological excavations during the 1980s. That building was torn down during the mid-1100s so that a stone church could be built to replace it. The stone building initially consisted of just a chancel (built around 1150) with the nave being built closer to 1180. The woodwork in the nave's roof construction is said to date from 1179 to 1180 after dendrochronological dating. The church has a rectangular nave with a smaller chancel with a lower roof line. Later, a semi-circular apse was added on the end of the chancel. The church was built on a hill called Bøhaugen, but it was built quite near the edge of the steep side of the hill. This area was prone to landslides and settling, so over the centuries, the foundations of the church became unstable causing settling in the walls. During the 1600s, a church porch was added to the main entry. Originally, the church itself did not have a bell tower, but instead the bells hung in a pillar in the churchyard. In the 16th century, the church had as many as seven bells on the pillar. In the early 1800s, a small bell tower on the roof of the nave was built.

In 1814, this church served as an election church (Norwegian: valgkirke). Together with more than 300 other parish churches across Norway, it was a polling station for elections to the 1814 Norwegian Constituent Assembly which wrote the Constitution of Norway. This was Norway's first national elections. Each church parish was a constituency that elected people called "electors" who later met together in each county to elect the representatives for the assembly that was to meet at Eidsvoll Manor later that year.

By the mid-1800s, the old church was in seriously bad shape. There were structural problems that were threatening the building, in addition to the fact that the old church was much smaller than it should be for the size of the parish. It was then decided to build a new Bø Church to replace the old building. Designs for the new church were drawn up and it was decided to build the new church on the west side of the present churchyard, about 75 metres (246 ft) to the northwest of the old church. The new church was built in 1874-1875 and it was consecrated in 1875. After this, the Old Bø Church was closed and no longer used. Later, the old church was restored and preserved for history after some fundraising by the local villagers. The old church is one of the few medieval stone churches still in existence that had not been changed much over the centuries.

== Media gallery ==
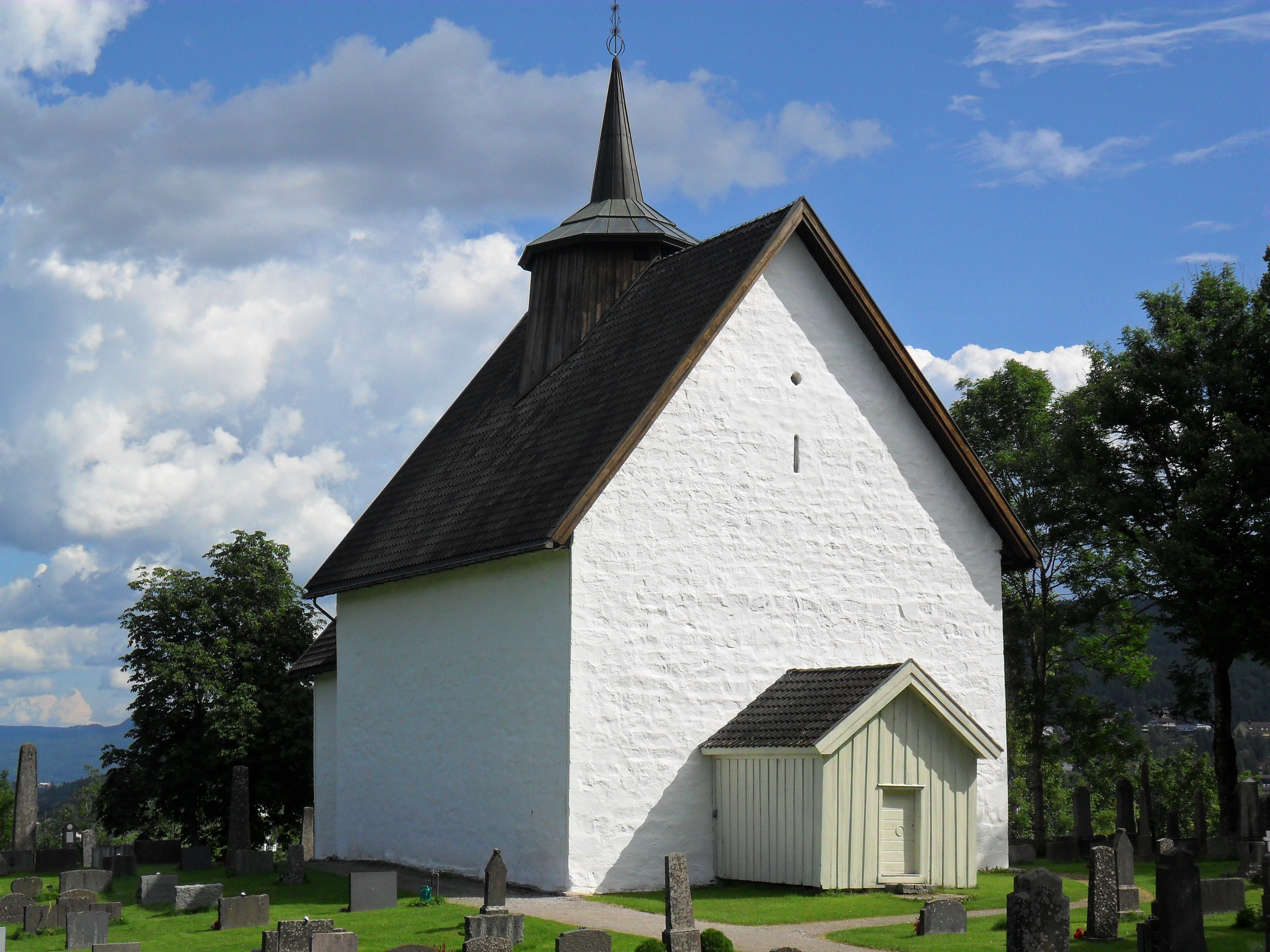

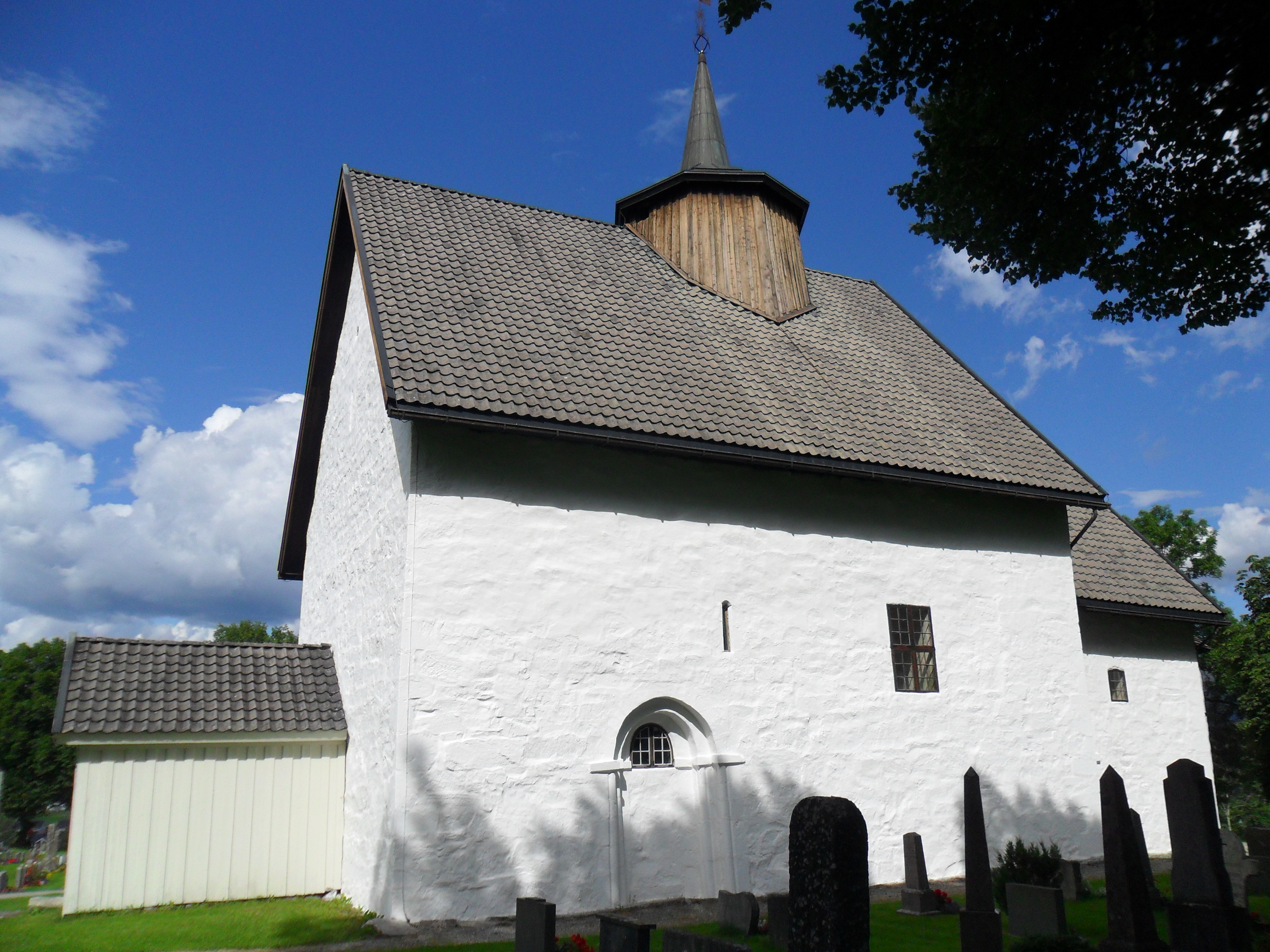

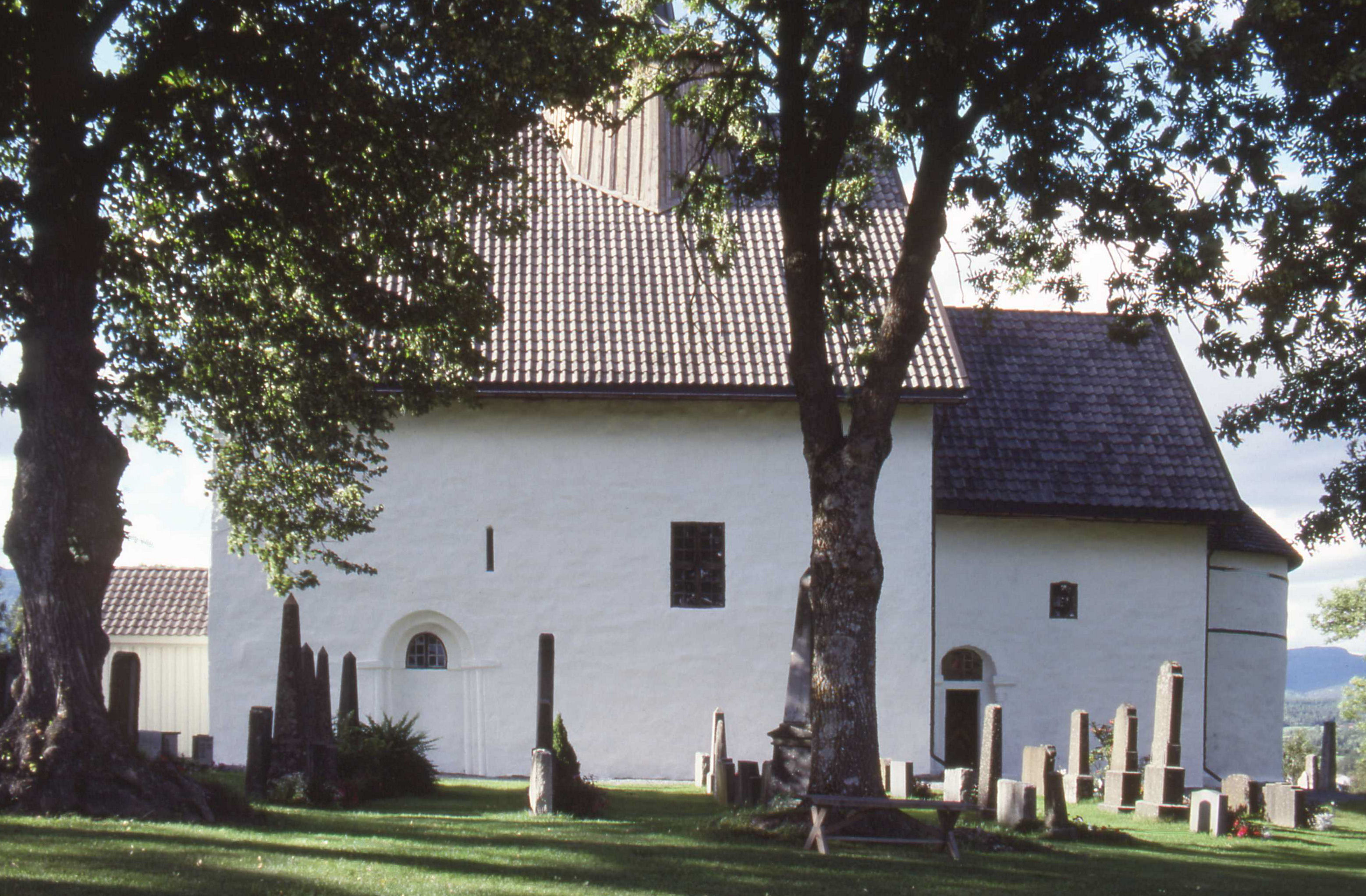

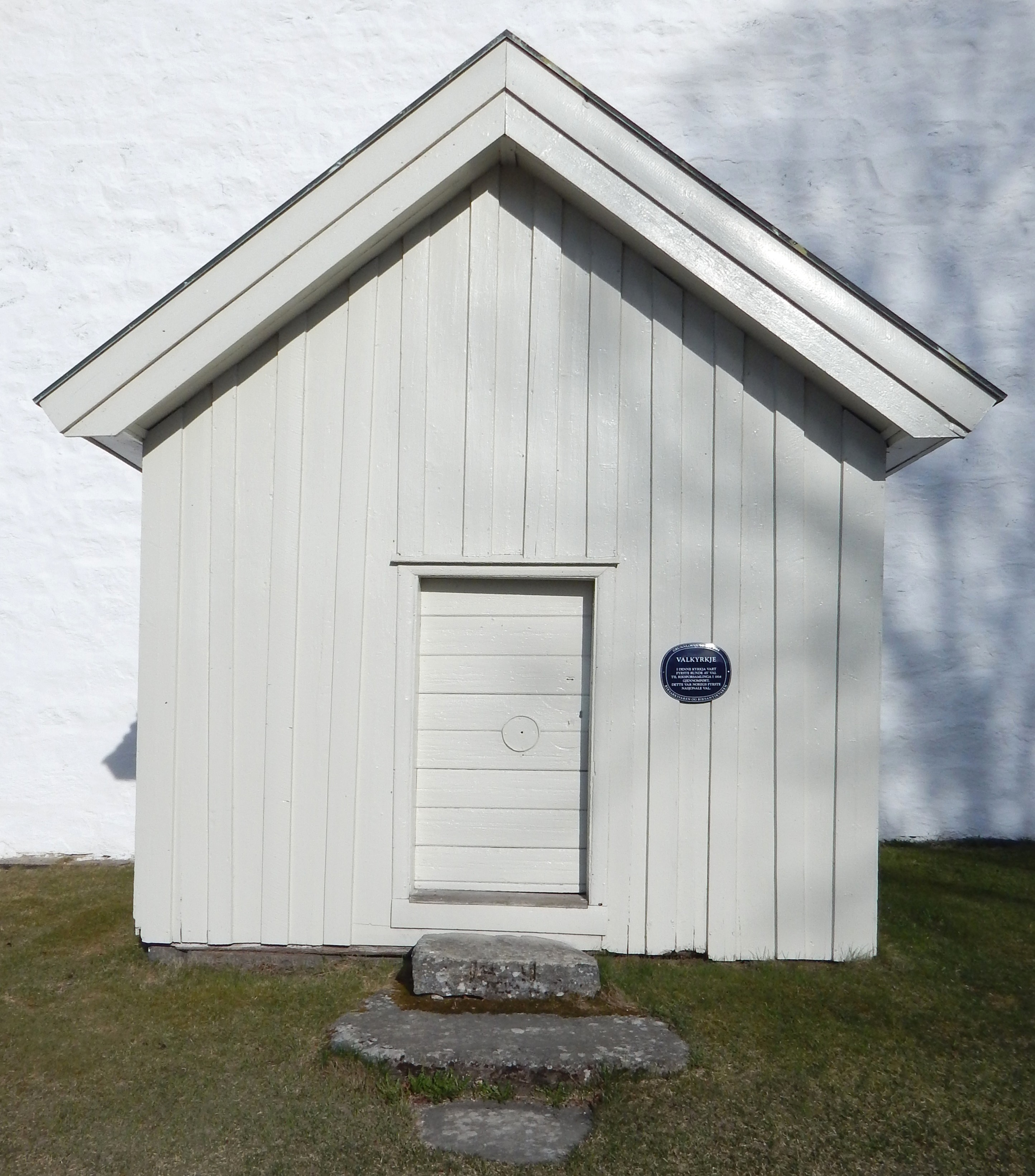

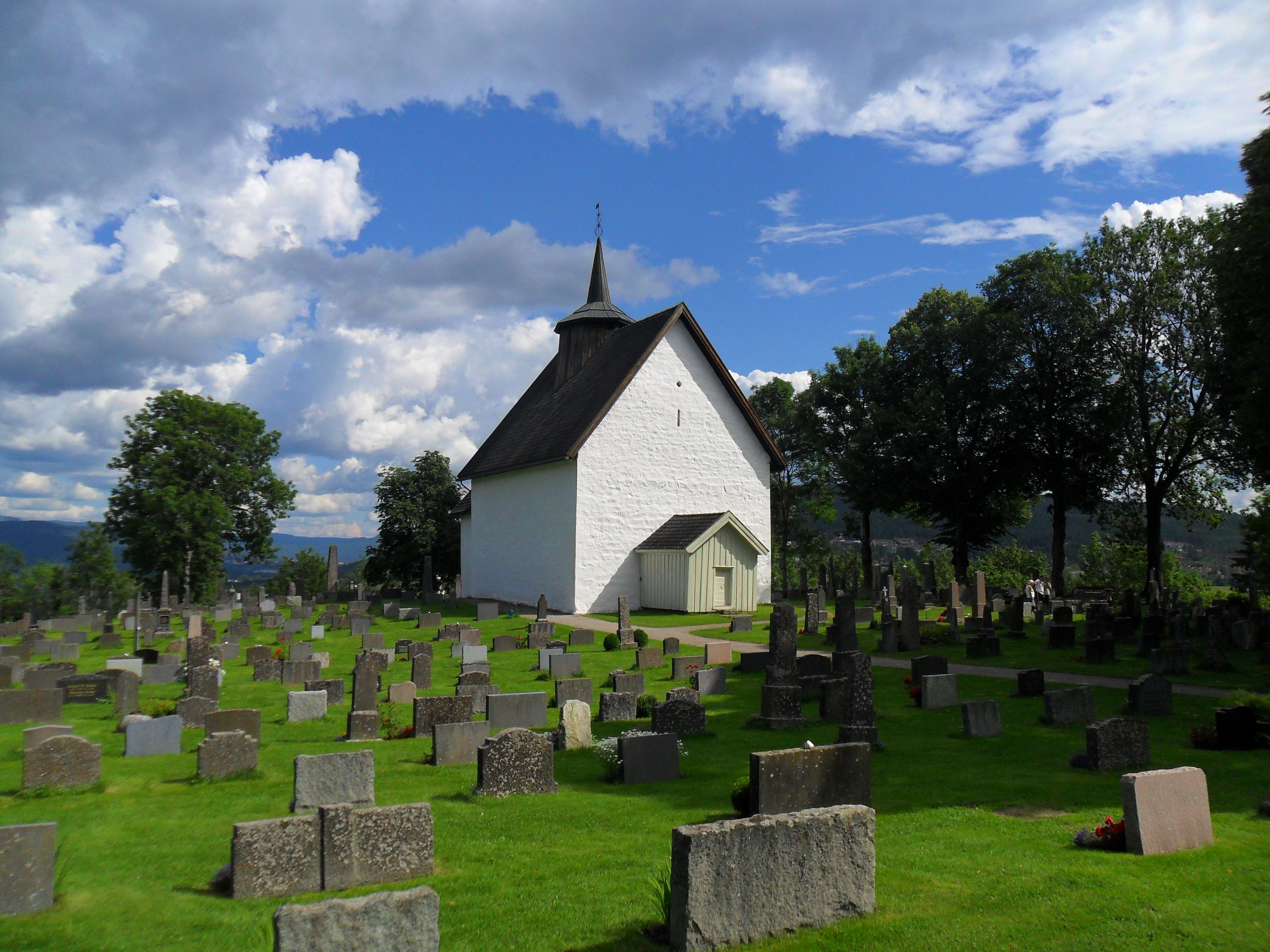

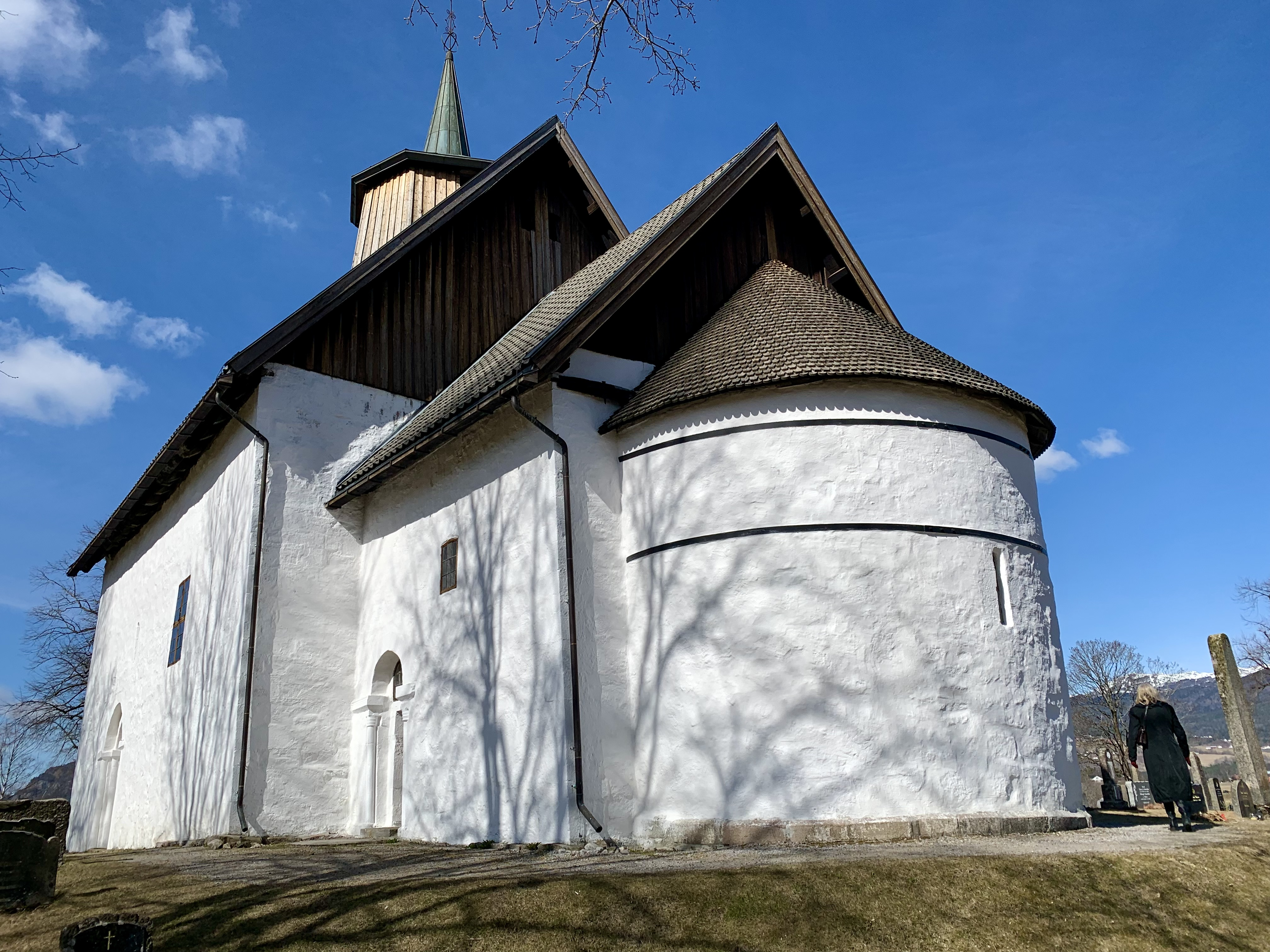

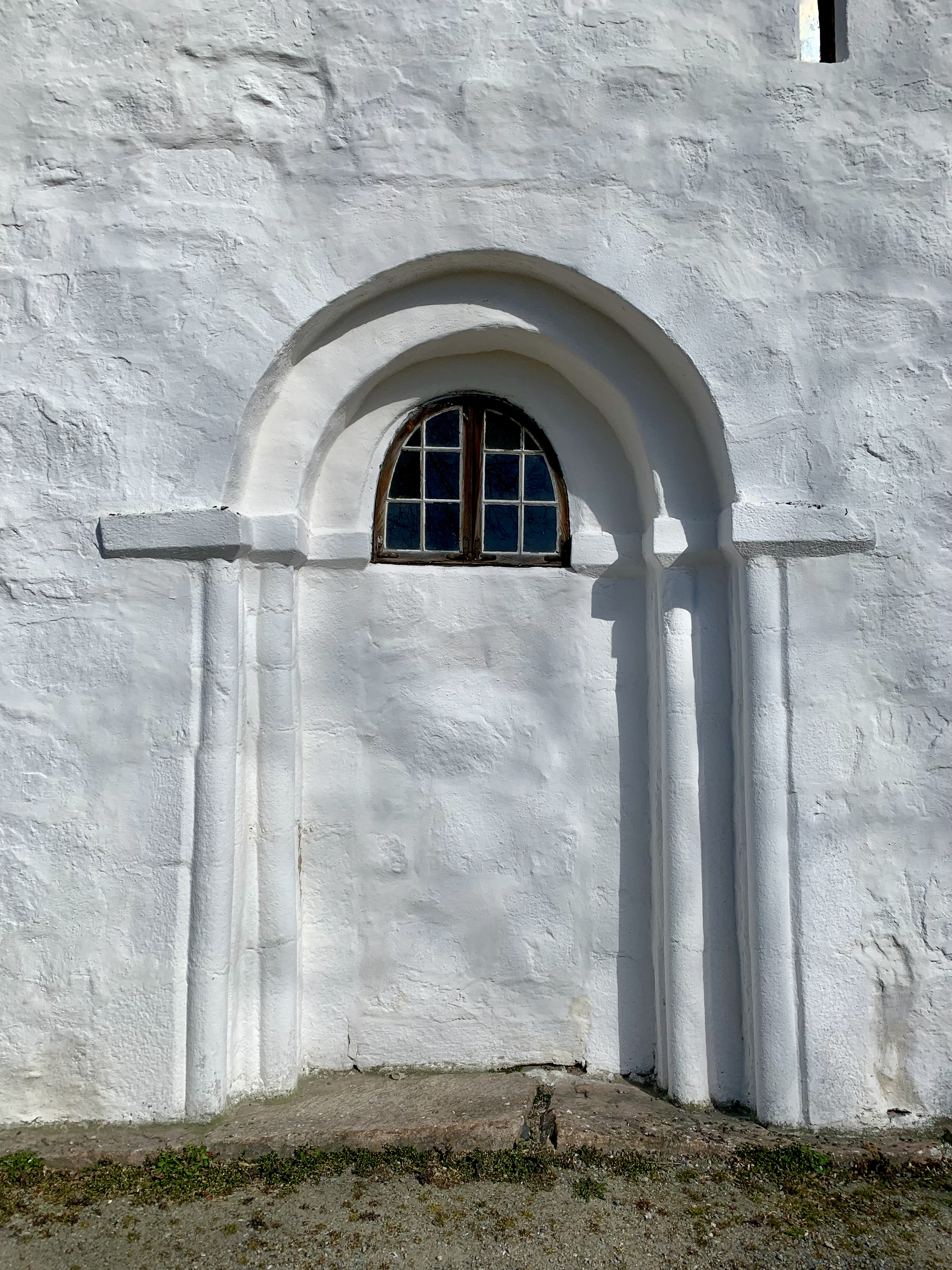

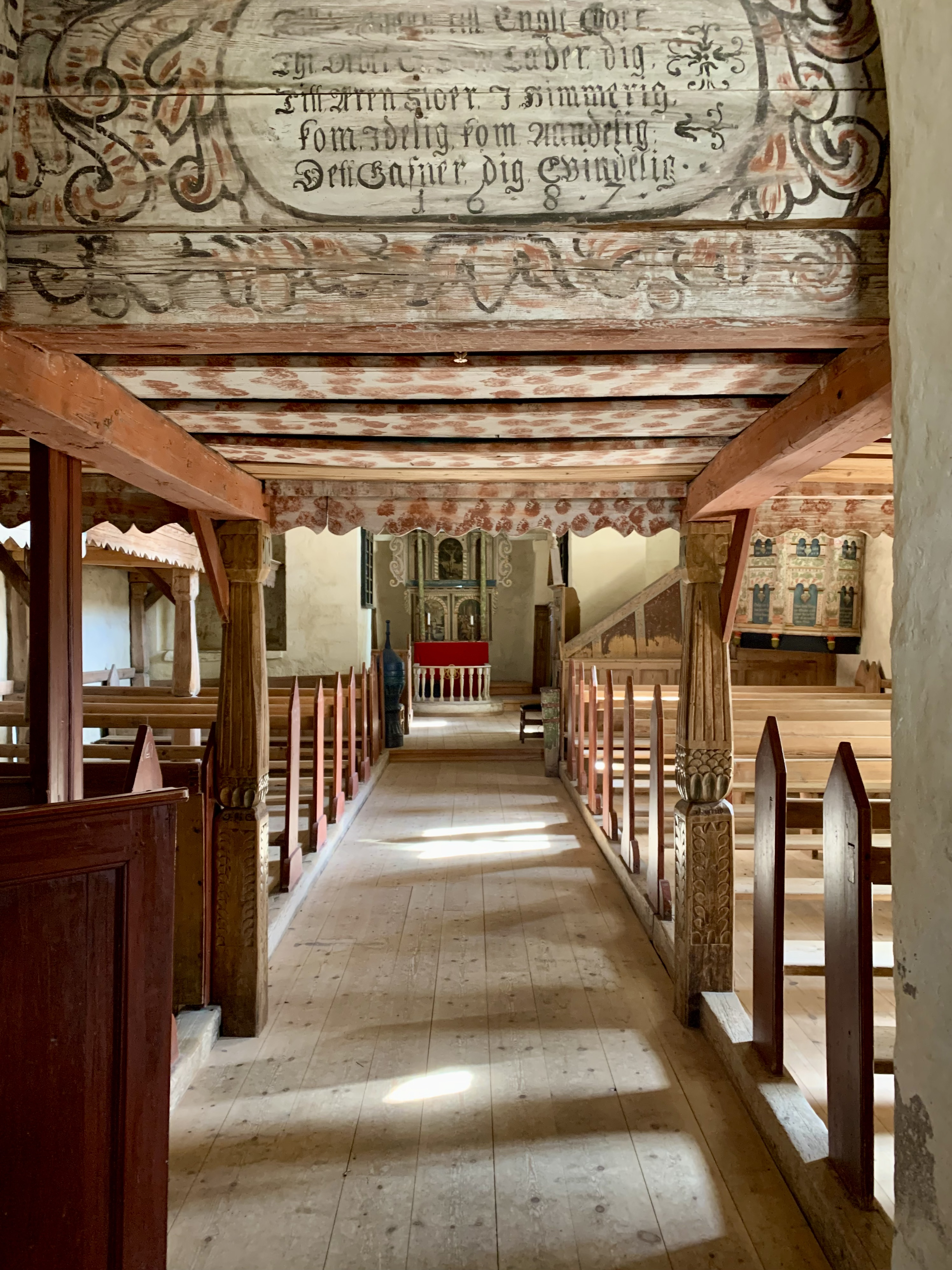

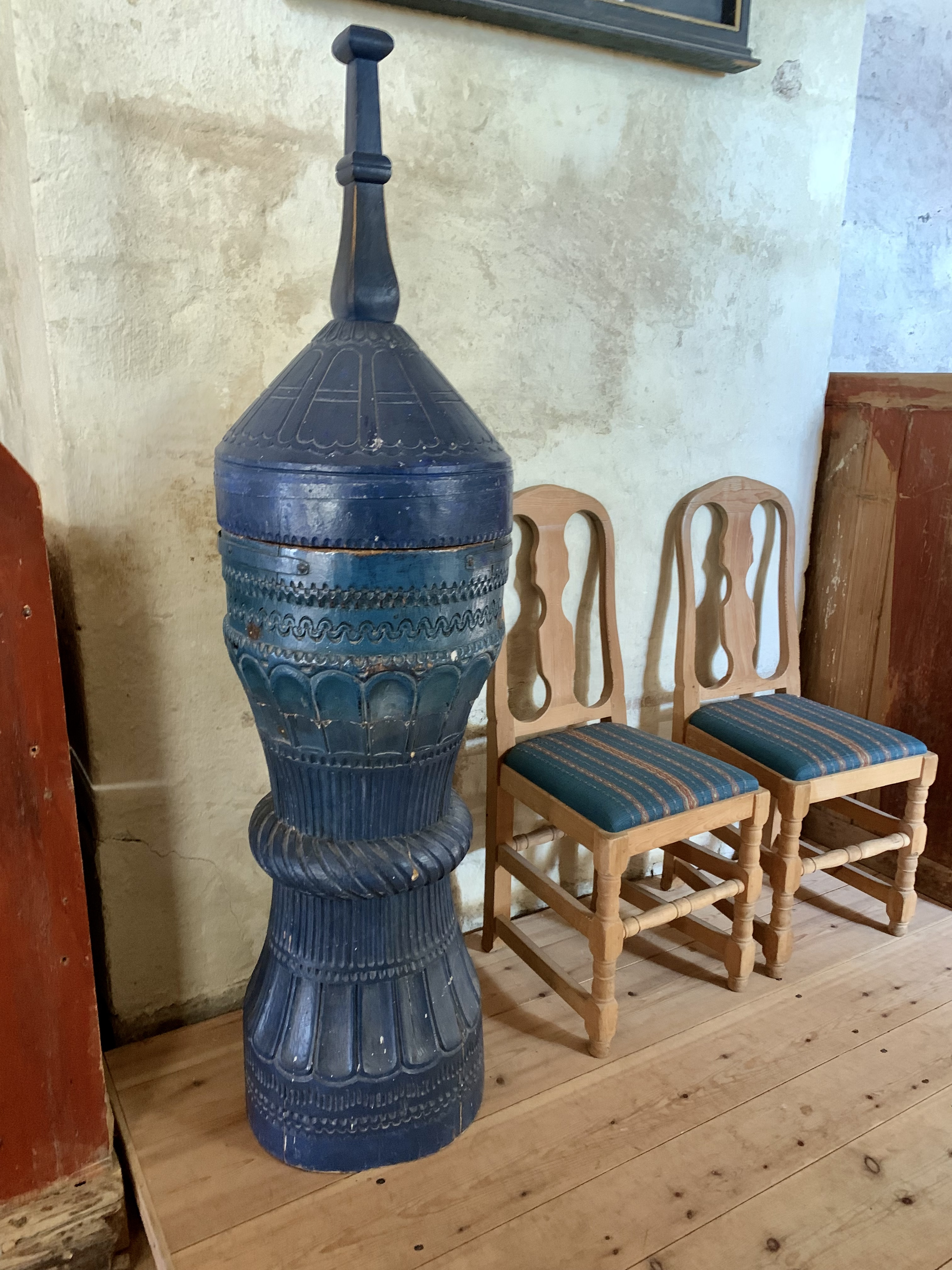
Baptismal font

== See also ==
- List of churches in Agder og Telemark
