= Tungsten (disambiguation) =

Tungsten is a chemical element with symbol W and atomic number 74.

Tungsten may also refer to:

- Tungsten (band), Swedish heavy metal band
- Tungsten (music), a type of phonograph pickup stylus
- Tungsten (film), 2011 Greek film
- Tungsten, Colorado, a ghost town
- Tungsten, Northwest Territories, a Canadian townsite
- Tungsten (Cantung) Airport, a Canadian private airport
- Palm Tungsten, Palm Inc.'s product line of personal digital assistants
- Operation Tungsten, World War II UK Royal Navy operation to sink the German battleship Tirpitz
- Tungsten, a character from the novel Blart: The Boy Who Didn't Want to Save the World
- Tungsten, a setting for color temperature on digital cameras
- Tungsten Network, a global electronic invoicing firm
- Nexus Q, a digital media player first demoed as Project Tungsten

== See also ==
- Wolfram (disambiguation)
- W (disambiguation)
- Isotopes of tungsten
