= Frank Prosser Bowden =

Australian public servant (1860–1934)

Frank Prosser Bowden (August 1860 – 28 May 1934) was a senior public servant, initially with the Tasmanian Post Office and following Federation, the federal Postmaster-General's Department. He was heavily involved in the development of Tasmania's telegraphy and telephony networks, and subsequently their integration into those of the Commonwealth. Notable for his participation with William Philpot Hallam's early wireless radio experiments.

== Early life and family ==
Bowden was born at Launceston in August, 1860, a son of the late John Gibson Bowden. He spent by far the greater portion of his life at Hobart, for his family removed from Launceston and came to the capital of Tasmania when he was six months old and he was at Hobart ever since. He received his education at private schools. In the first place he attended a school kept by a Mr. Cairnduff (popularly known as "Plummy") in Brisbane-street, and afterwards was a scholar at Mr. E. D. Oldfield's Academy at the corner of Argyle and Brisbane streets in those days. At 12½ years of age he said good-bye to school, and made his first venture in the business world at Fletcher's stationery warehouse, then situated in Liverpool St, next to Mr. R. A. Mather's establishment. "Young Bowden," as he then was styled, left the stationery business in order to enter the postal service — and there found his niche. He was married in 1891, at Port Cygnet. In 1925 his wife had passed some years prior. He had three sons and three daughters. His eldest son, Eric Bowden, was an equipment engineer in the Postmaster-General's Department at Hobart and went on to become the Tasmanian Wireless Inspector. Frank Philip Bowden, his second son, was taking his B.Sc. degree in 1925, and was demonstrator in physics at the Tasmanian University, and the third son. Mr. J. G. Bowden, was associated with the electrical firm of Messrs. Medhurst and Sons.

== Professional career ==
Bowden took up the duties of telegraph messenger on 1 April 1875, the telegraph department at that time being a separate branch of the post office. Fred A. Packer was Superintendent of Telegraphs at the time, with J. J. Macdonald the chief operator. Morse recorders were then in use, he explained, either "embossers" or "inkers," and the received telegrams were transcribed at sight from the tape by hand on to the forms for delivery. Various systems were adopted subsequently. At first the recorders were replaced by sounders, messages received being taken by sound. That was followed by the duplex system, worked two ways, two messages being simultaneously received and sent on the one wire. The successor to this system was the quadruplex system, which enabled four messages — two sent and two received — to pass on one wire at the same time. The next development was the introduction of the Wheatstone automatic duplex system. This was run on both cables to the mainland of Australia. By the system, on each cable, received messages are taken on tape which is gummed on to forms and transcribed for delivery. The "sent" business was punched on a Gell or Kleinschmidt keyboard perforator and despatched through a transmitter to the distant station, where Morse signals appear on the tape. The Murray multiplex system then came into vogue, but was still in the experimental stage in Tasmania. Bowden served as a messenger for nine months, and in 1870 was appointed as operator. In 1887 he became chief operator, in succession to Mr. Macdonald, and in 1891 received the appointment of manager of the telegraph office at Hobart. Some four years later he found himself installed as chief clerk and operator, telegraph branch, under the scheme by which the postal and telegraph departments were amalgamated, and in 1899 was appointed manager of the telegraph branch, each successive step re-presenting promotion. In 1919 Bowden was temporarily transferred as Commonwealth Electoral Officer for Tasmania to conduct the Federal elections in that year, and after the elections he resumed his duties in the Postmaster-General's Department, the following year, as manager of the telegraph branch. It may be noted that telegraph and telephone duties were combined as from the inception of the telephone system in 1883 until May, 1922, when a separate telephone branch was created with Mr. P. N. Ferris as telephone manager. Bowden's duties at various times included jurisdiction over the telegraph traffic throughout the State, as distinct from the management of the telegraph office at Hobart. Bowden retired from the public service at age 65 on 18 August 1925, having served for some 50 years and three months. At retirement he noted that the former Deputy Postmaster at Hobart, Mr. H. L. D'Emden, who retired in August, 1923, William Philpot Hallam, who left the service in August, 1924, and himself were all three telegraph messengers, having entered the service together.

== Personal life ==
As a boy chorister in St. David's Cathedral he first sang the solo, "I was glad when they said unto me we will go into the house of the Lord" and extent for the few years he spent as a member of the choir there. He had been a parishioner of Holy Trinity Church. He sang in the choir at Holy Trinity when about 10 years of age, during the rectorate of the Ven. Arch-deacon Davenport, and it was when St. David's Cathedral was opened that with other boy choristers from various parish churches he assisted with his voice in the opening ceremony, and with other boys remained there for a time. In 1900 Bowden returned to Trinity Church, was appointed choirmaster some three years later, and has held the position till 1925. His name is musically remembered as having been associated with the Mohawk Club and the Orpheus Club. For more than 20 years he was secretary to the Philharmonic Society and other musical organisations, and his tenor voice was on many occasions heard as a soloist in "The Messiah" and other works. He was also associated with the introduction of the popular "Waltzing Matilda" in connection with local community singing. He supplemented his many activities in church life by serving on a number of Diocesan church committees, was a member of the Synod and Diocesan Council, and vice-chairman of the Church of England Men's Society. An enthusiastic Mason, Mr. Bowden joined the Pacific Lodge at Hobart 35 years ago, and has passed through various Grand Lodge offices. In 1925 he held the rank of Past Deputy Grand Master and president of the Board of General Purposes. The Pacific Lodge made him an honorary life member, and when the rank of Past Deputy Grand Master was conferred on him the mother lodge presented him with a handsome set of regalia. Bowden was a particularly keen bowler and also a fisherman. For 40 years he spend his annual holidays on the East Coast for bream fishing at Swansea and Swanport, and has been a member of the Derwent Bowling Club since its inception.

== Late life and legacy ==
Jenvey retired from the Postmaster-General's Department in 1910 after 40 years of service.

== Artifacts ==
- Museums Victoria Jenvey's Coherer, used for communication with St. George, 1901

== Publications ==
- Jenvey, H. W. Practical telegraphy : a guide for the use of officers of the Victorian Post and Telegraph Department. vol. 1 (2nd edition Melbourne, 1891) Trove
