= Cape Christie =

Cape Christie (72°18′S 170°1′E) is a cape situated 5 nautical miles (9 km) west-northwest of Cape Hallett, marking the west side of the entrance to Edisto Inlet on the coast of Victoria Land. It was discovered, January 15, 1841, by Sir James Clark Ross and named for Professor Samuel Hunter Christie, of the Royal Military Academy, Woolwich.
