= Phonofiddle =

Mechanically amplified stringed musical instrument

- A. T. Howson phonofiddle, 1904–1939

String instrument
- Classification: Bowed string instrument
- Hornbostel–Sachs classification: 321.322-71 (Composite chordophone sounded by a bow)
- Inventor: Johannes Matthias Augustus Stroh
- Developed: 1889

Related instruments
- Stroh violin; violin

Builders
- A. T. Howson; Stroviols

A phonofiddle or phono-fiddle is a class of stringed musical instruments that are played with a bow and use a phonograph-type reproducer as a voice-box.

The sound-producing diaphragm may be a metal cone, as in the Stroh violin, or a mica sheet, as in the instruments made by A. T. Howson, London, and the Stroviols company of Britain. The sound generated by the vibrations from the string or strings are transferred through the bridge to a connecting arm into the center of the diaphragm within the reproducer. The vibrating column of air is then directed into one or several horns.

On 4 May 1899, Johannes Matthias Augustus Stroh applied for a patent in Great Britain, GB9418, titled "Improvements in Violins and other Stringed Instruments", which was accepted on 24 March 1900. This described the use of a flat metal (other materials are also mentioned) diaphragm in the voice-box (reproducer) of a violin to mechanically amplify the sound.

Then on 16 February 1901, he applied for a second patent in Great Britain, GB3393, titled "Improvements in the Diaphragms of Phonographs, Musical Instruments, and anologous Sound-producing, Recording and Transmitting Contrivances", which was accepted on 14 December 1901. This effectively extended the first concept to now use a conical resonator with corrugations at its edge, allowing a more 'rigid' diaphragm. His failure to register his inventions in the United States allowed John Dopyera and Geo Beauchamp to subsequently obtain US patents for the tricone and single cone designs used in national brand instruments.

The use of a phonograph reproducer with mica Isinglass diaphragms allowed the cost of production to be reduced.

Phonofiddles had a brief period of popularity as studio instruments for the acoustic recording of phonograph records, as the energy of the sound could be directed into the collection horn of the recording equipment. Later, the phonofiddle was relegated to novelty performances, such as those of The Temperance Seven and Bennett & Williams.

== See also ==
- Stroh violin
- Violin
