= Stroh violin =

Mechanically amplified stringed musical instrument

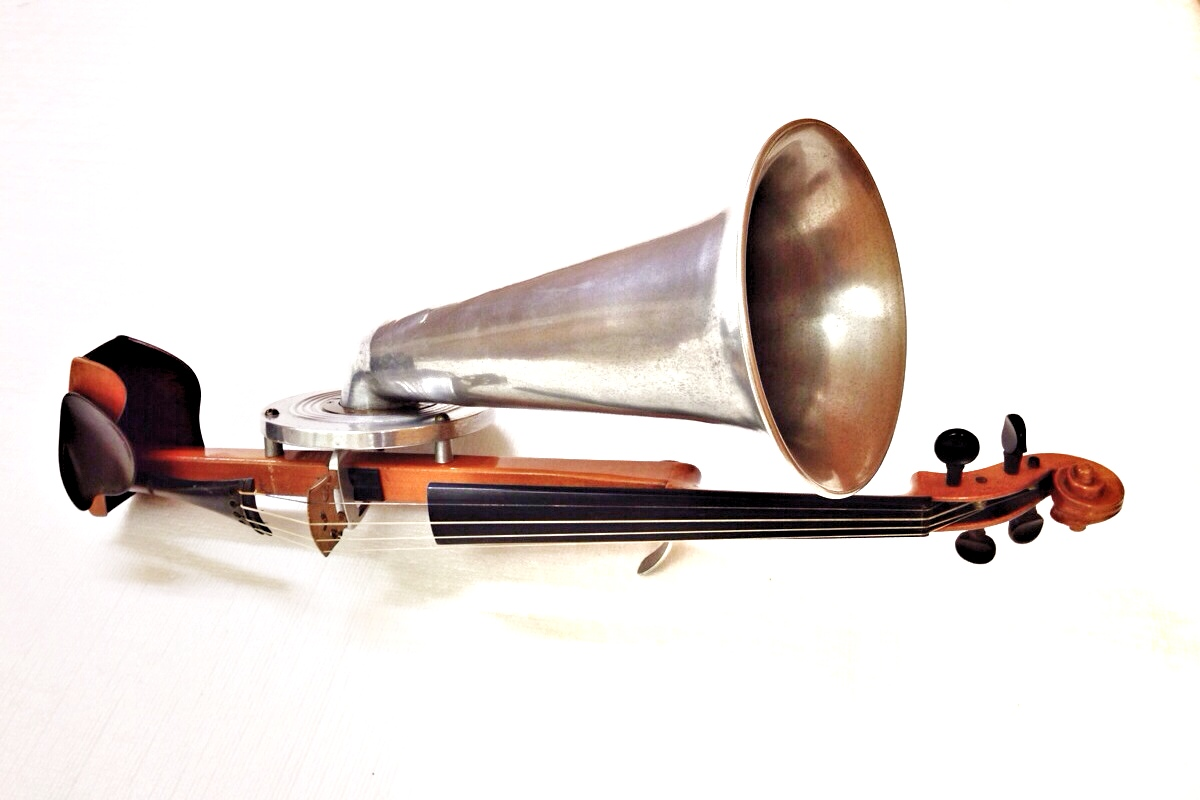
- Stroh violin at the Museu de la Música de Barcelona

String instrument
- Other names: Stroviol; horn-violin; violinophone
- Classification: Bowed string instrument
- Hornbostel–Sachs classification: 321.322-71 (Composite chordophone sounded by a bow)
- Inventor: Johannes Matthias Augustus Stroh
- Developed: 1889

Related instruments
- Phonofiddle; violin

The Stroh violin or Stroviol is a type of stringed musical instrument that is mechanically amplified by a metal resonator and horn attached to its body. The name Stroviol refers to a violin, but other instruments have been modified with the amplification device, including the viola, cello, double bass, ukulele, mandolin and guitar. Johannes Matthias Augustus Stroh, an electrical engineer from Frankfurt, invented the instrument in London in 1899.

== Description ==
Demonstration by Luisa Brown of the Stroh violin, St Cecilia's Hall, Edinburgh

The Stroh violin has a horn attached at the end of the fingerboard, to project the sound to an audience or recording horn, and often a smaller monitoring horn that the performer placed at their ear to hear what was being played more distinctly.

The Stroh violin is much louder than a standard wooden violin, and its directional projection of sound made it particularly useful in the early days of phonographic recordingic. Wooden violins recorded poorly with the early acoustic-mechanical recording method, and the Stroh violin improved this by producing a fuller, louder sound.

Stroh violins were common in recording studios but became rarer after record companies switched to electric microphone recording technology in the second half of the 1920s.

== Invention ==
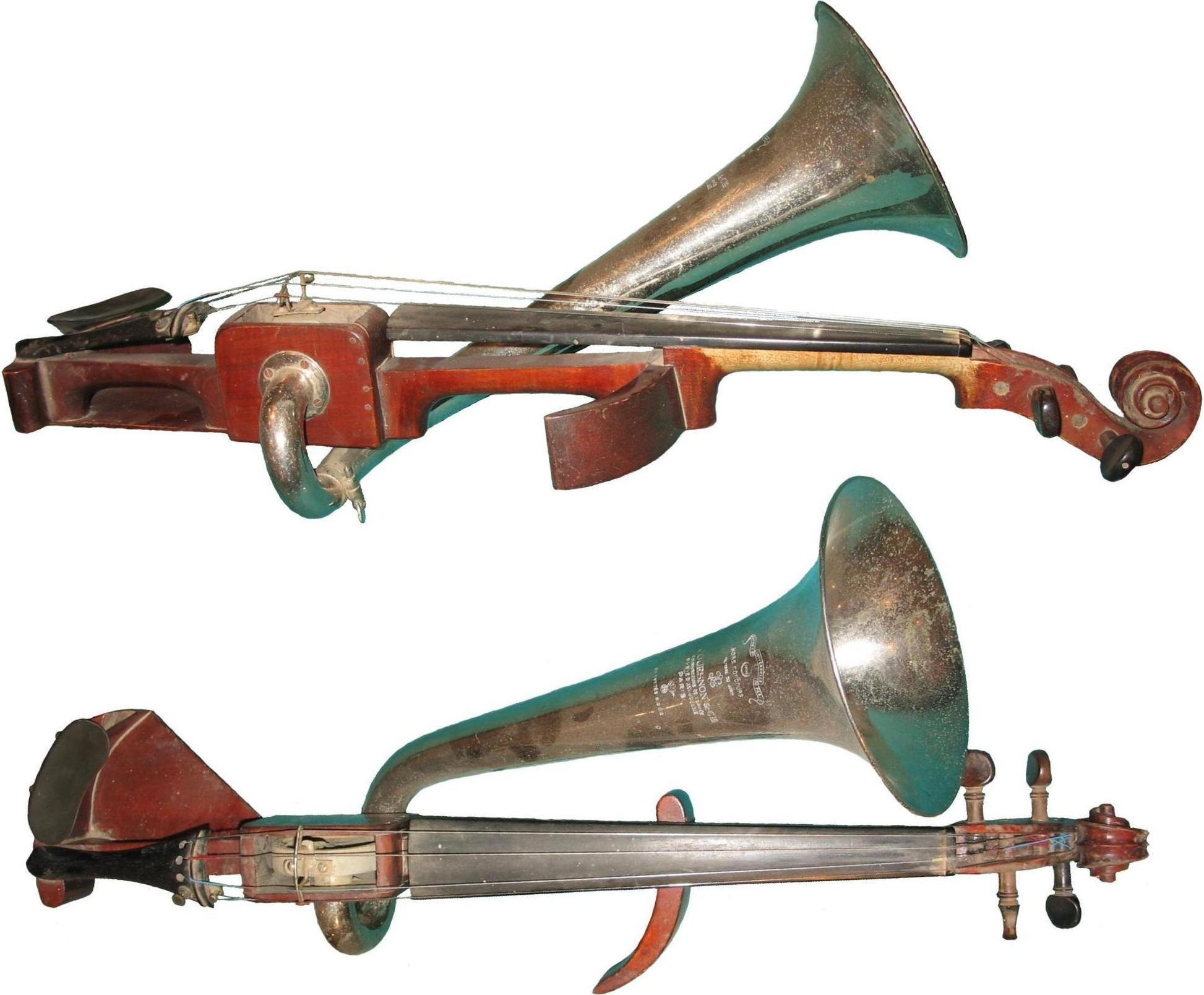
Cousnon Stroh violin, 1934

On 4 May 1899, Stroh applied for a UK patent, GB9418, titled "Improvements in Violins and other Stringed Instruments", which was accepted on 24 March 1900. This described the use of a flat metal (other materials are also mentioned) diaphragm in the voice-box (reproducer) of a violin to mechanically amplify the sound. On 16 February 1901, he applied for a second UK patent, GB3393, titled "Improvements in the Diaphragms of Phonographs, Musical Instruments, and analogous Sound-producing, Recording and Transmitting Contrivances", which was accepted on 14 December 1901. This effectively extended the first concept to now use a conical resonator with corrugations at its edge, allowing a more 'rigid' diaphragm. His failure to register his inventions in the United States allowed John Dopyera and Geo Beauchamp to subsequently obtain US patents for the tricone and single-cone designs used in National brand instruments.

== Usage ==
A busker playing a Stroh violin in Antwerp, Belgium, 2014

The Stroh violin was an expensive instrument: in 1911, it was offered by the London dealer Barnes & Mullins for nine guineas (£9.45, then equal to $37.80) or twelve guineas (£12.60/$50.40), at a time when a reasonable factory violin could be bought for two guineas. It was listed as being especially suitable for use in small theaters and music halls.

In the 1920s in Buenos Aires, Julio de Caro, a renowned tango orchestra director and violinist, used the Stroh violin in his live performances, and it was called violín-corneta (cornet violin) by the locals.

A Stroh violin was used in Uirapuru, a 1917–1934 composition by Heitor Villa-Lobos.

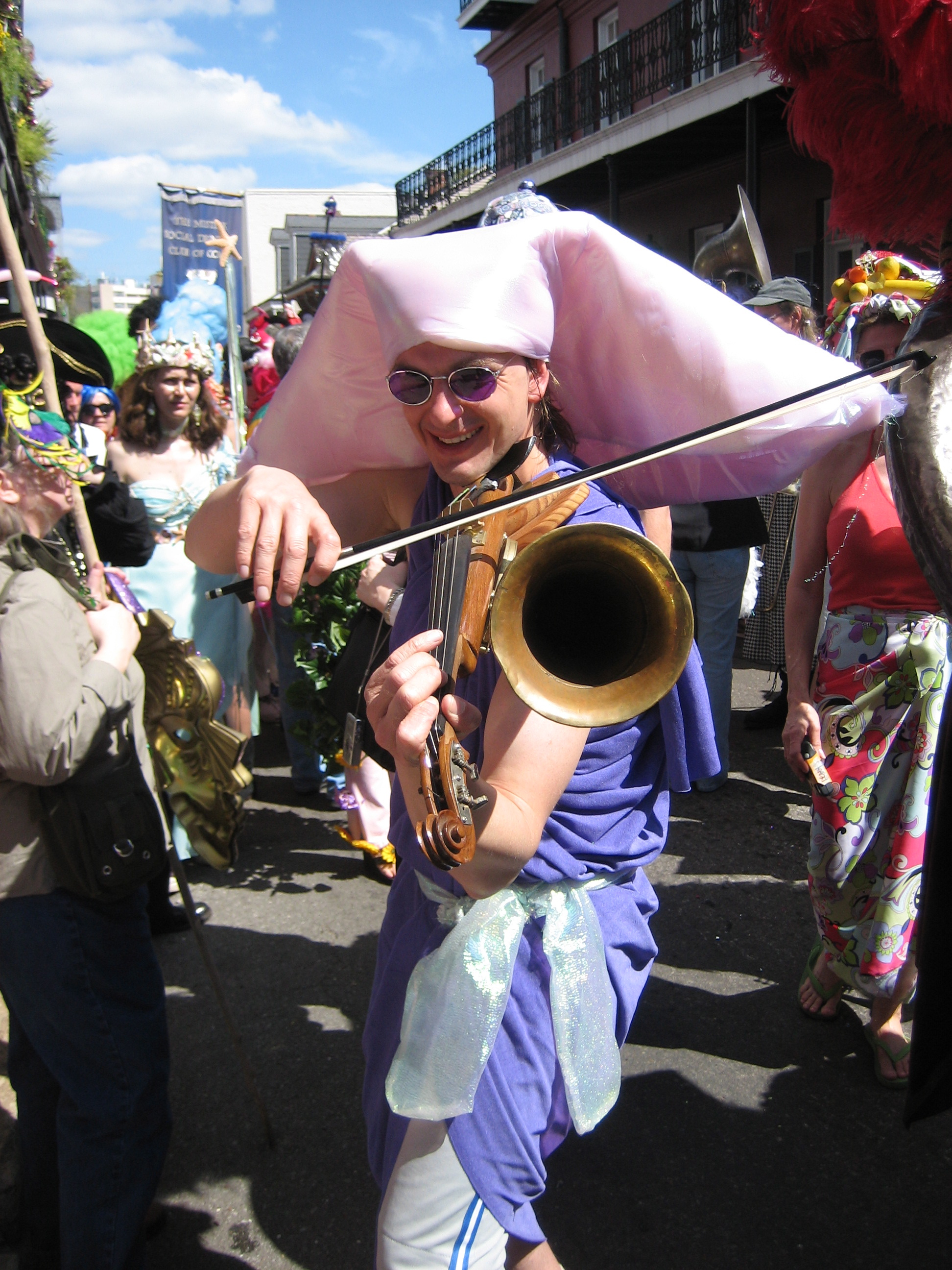
A Stroh violin player in a New Orleans Mardi Gras parade, 2006

A number of musicians, including Tom Waits, Carla Kihlstedt, Thomas Newman, Bat for Lashes, A Hawk and a Hacksaw and Eric Gorfain continue to use the Stroh violin for its distinctive sound. Shakira featured a Stroh violin on her 2010–11 The Sun Comes Out World Tour, with multi-instrumentalist Úna Palliser playing it on some songs. Palliser also played Stroh violin on a Tom Hickox album and live with Bitter Ruin. Pinky Weitzman plays the Stroh violin for various New York experimental ensembles, including her own project (Not Waving but Drowning), as well as Flare, LD & the New Criticism, and as part of the onstage ensemble for Stephin Merritt's My Life as a Fairy Tale. A Stroh violin is regularly played by Andy Stein of Vince Giordano's Nighthawks Orchestra. They Might Be Giants used a Stroh violin in their song "I Can Hear You", recorded on a wax cylinder at the Edison Laboratory.

The composer Mauricio Kagel uses a reconstructed Stroh violin, viola, cello and double bass in his work 1898, composed in 1972–1973. Kagel found a photograph dated 1910 of a small instrumental group in a recording studio which includes three Stroh violins. Intrigued by the instrument, he set out to find an example. He manufactured a copy of the pictured instrument in collaboration with the Darmstadt violin maker Franz-Ernst Peschke, adapting the pickup system so that the bodies of existing violins could be used as a base. In 1973, he was given a Stroh cello by Karl Schlamminger, which he had bought from a Baghdad music dealer in 1920. Other conventional instruments are used in the work as well as a children's choir.

== Similar designs ==
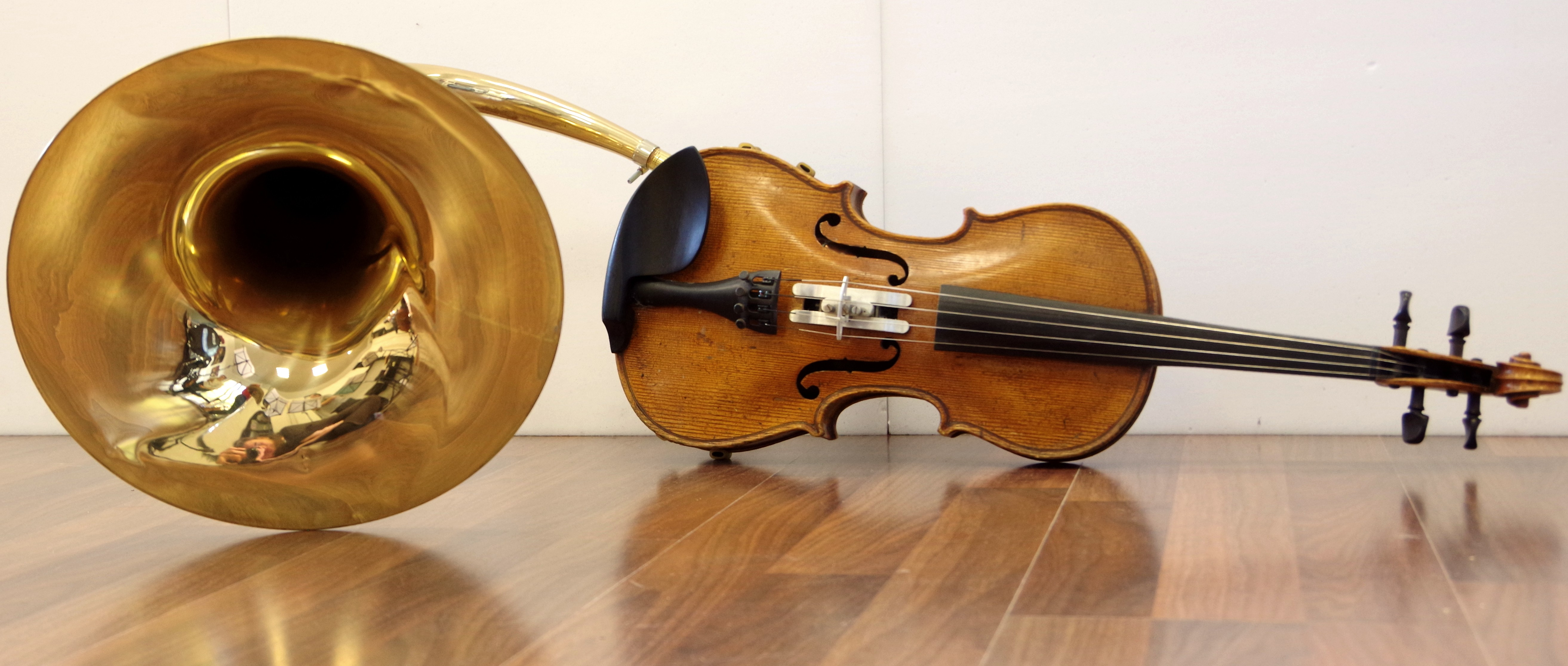
Violinophone built by Klaus Eberle (director of the Graz Salon Orchestra)

Other makers created similar designs, such as A. T. Howson, which made brass-horned phono instruments, including single-stringed phonofiddles and four-stringed phono ukuleles.

The violinophone was made in Prague in the early 20th century. This instrument has a diaphragm mounted vertically in a violin body under the bridge. The sound is carried through a tube to the horn which protrudes from the violin to a long horn that wraps around the shoulder. It is essentially a violin that amplifies its sound through a metal resonator and metal horns rather than a wooden sound box as on a standard violin.

Willy Tiebel of Markneukirchen, Germany, made Stroh violin copies in the 1920s.

The Stroh violin is closely related to another horned violin which uses a mica sheet-resonating diaphragm, the phonofiddle.

In the present day, many types of horn-violin exist, especially in the Balkans.

== Romanian horn-violin ==
The Romanian horn-violin, built through the 20th century, is similar to the Stroh violin. It has the same length as the Stroh violin, but its horn is narrower and yields a more directional sound. The structure of the instrument is based on the tungsten stylus of a gramophone.

The vibrations of the strings and bridge are transmitted by a thin rod to the membrane of the gramophone-element. The membrane transforms these vibrations into sound waves, which are amplified by the horn or beaker. The horn-violin is harder to play than a normal violin because the reaction of the bow on the strings is less flexible, and the instrument's weight is less evenly distributed. This causes an imbalance on the shoulder.

The instrument is still used in Romanian folk music for playing horas and doinas, and mixes well with the characteristic sound of the pan flute. It is generally used sparingly due to its tone. The horn-violin is especially used in folk music of the Bihor region of Romania. Famous practitioners of this style include the fiddler Gheorghe Rada; singers Florica Bradu, Florica Ungur, Florica Duma, Leontin Ciucur, Cornel Borza, Vasile Iova, Maria Haiduc and Viorica Flintașu; and the renowned folk ensembles Crișana and Rapsozii Zarandului.

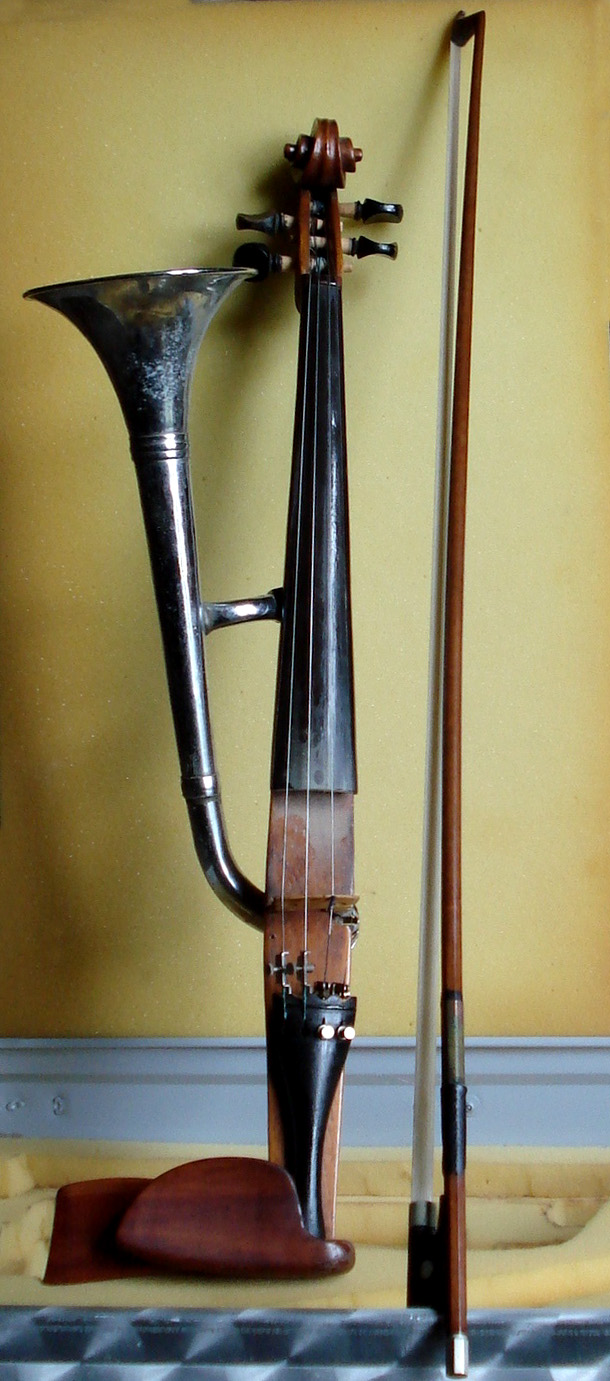
Romanian horn-violin with its bow

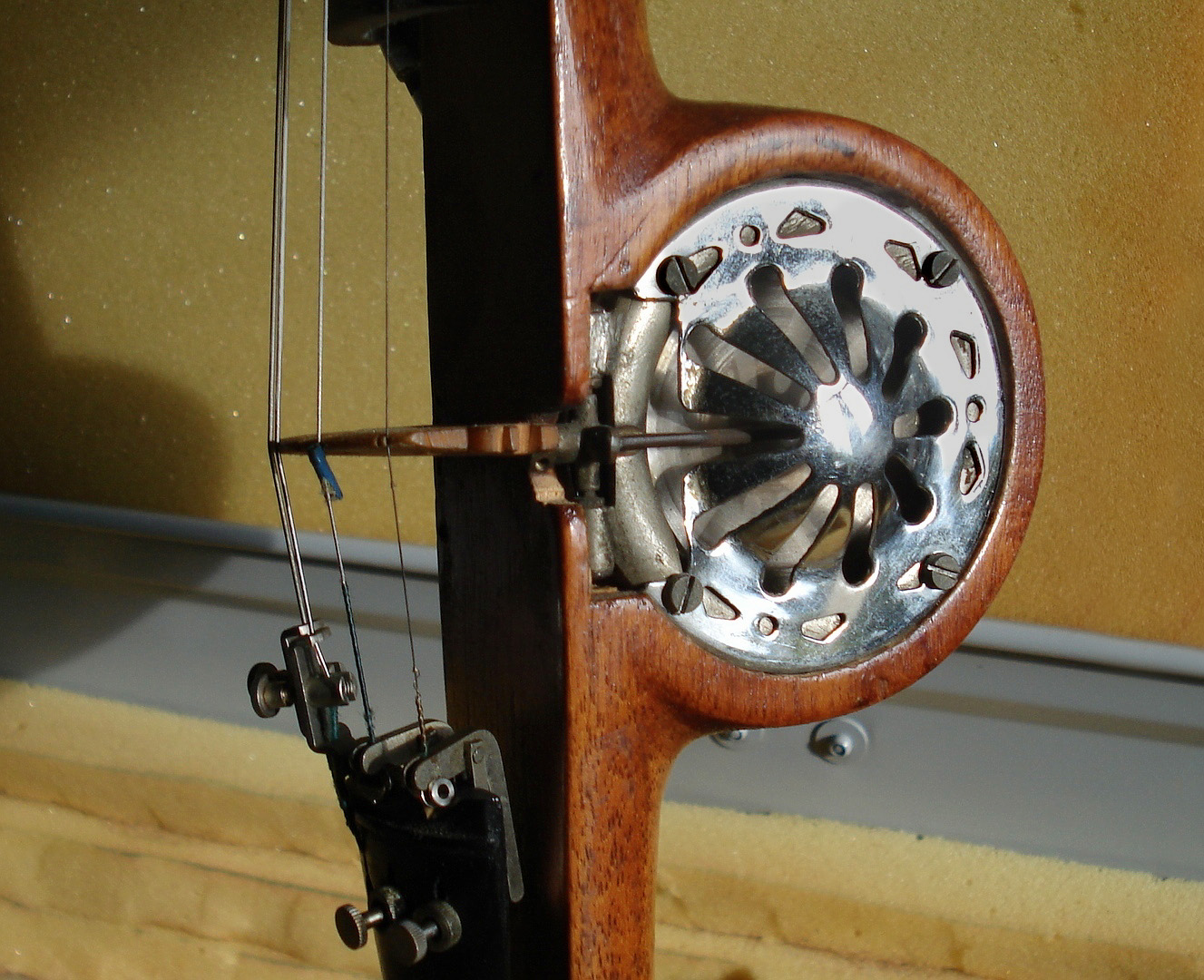
The diaphragm of a gramophone serves as the vibration receiver which creates sound waves in the horn

== See also ==
- Violin
- Phonofiddle
- Fiddle
- Hardanger fiddle
- Kontra
- Låtfiol
- Rabeca
