= Kaleidophone =

Physics tool

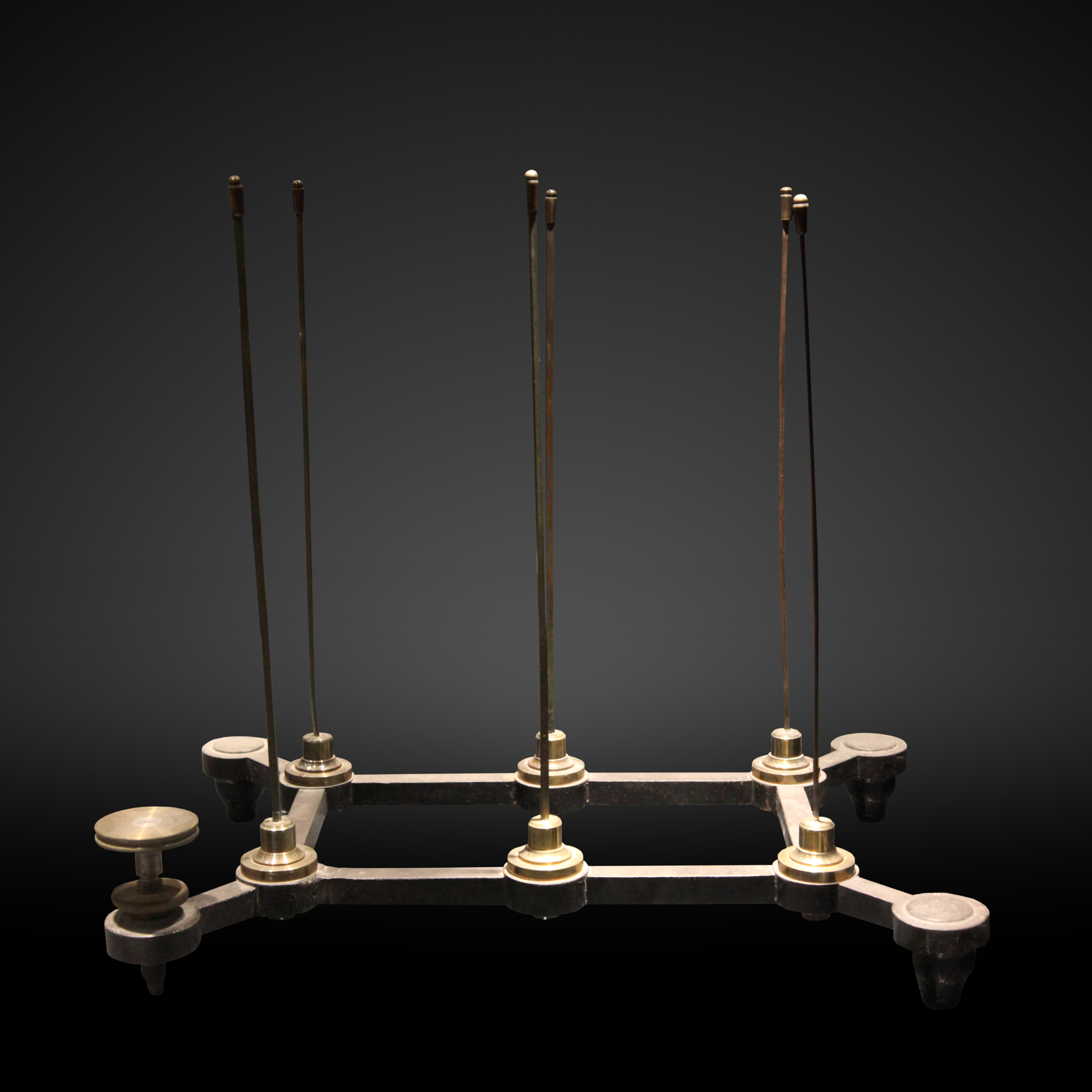
Kaleidophone on display at Palais de la Découverte in Paris.

The kaleidophone is a "philosophical toy" that produces moving optical figures.

== History ==
The kaleidophone was invented by Charles Wheatstone, who published an account of the device in 1827.

The name "kaleidophone" was derived from the kaleidoscope, an optical toy invented in 1817 by David Brewster.

Wheatstone's photometer was probably suggested by this appliance. The photometer enables two lights to be compared by the relative brightness of their reflections in a silvered bead, which describes a narrow ellipse, so as to draw the spots into parallel lines.

There are several different versions of the kaleidophone, but in all cases at least one slender rod is fixed at one end and has a shiny bead fixed to the other end of the rod. As the rod vibrates the spot is seen to describe Lissajous curves in the air, like a spark whirled about in the darkness.
