= Charles Wheatstone =

English physicist and inventor (1802–1875)

Sir Charles Wheatstone FRS FRSE
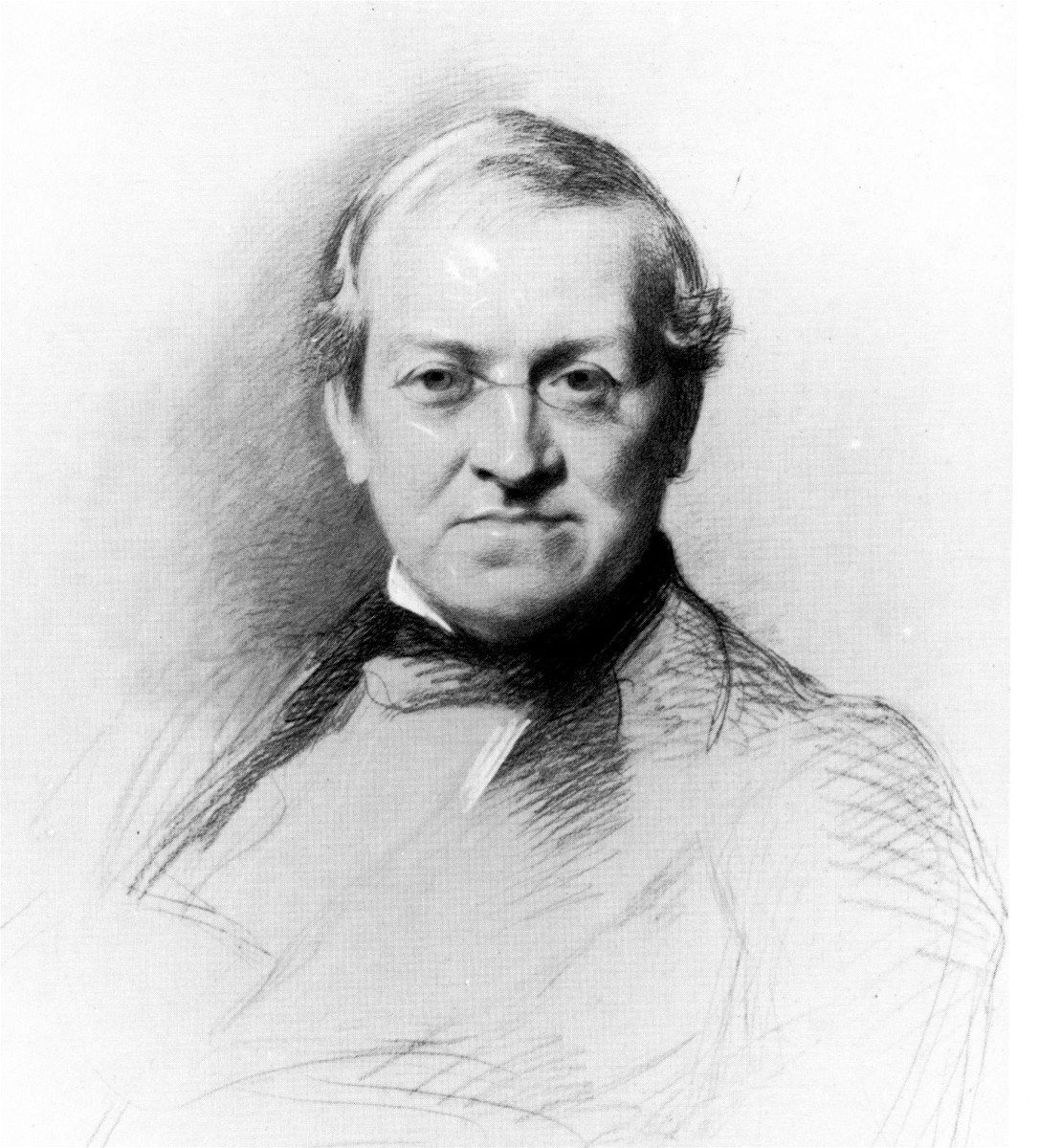
- Sketch of Wheatstone by Samuel Laurence, 1868
- Born: 6 February 1802; Barnwood, Gloucester, England
- Died: 19 October 1875 (aged 73); Paris, France
- Known for: Wheatstone bridge; Wheatstone system; Wheatstone–Playfair cipher; Wheatstone ABC telegraph; Cooke and Wheatstone telegraph; Kaleidophone; Potentiometer; Pseudoscope; Stereoscope
- Awards: Royal Medal (1840, 1843); Albert Medal (1867); Copley Medal (1868)
- Scientific career
- Fields: Physics
- Workplaces: King's College London

Sir Charles Wheatstone (/ˈwiːtstən/; 6 February 1802 – 19 October 1875) was an English physicist and inventor best known for his contributions to the development of the Wheatstone bridge, originally invented by Samuel Hunter Christie, which is used to measure an unknown electrical resistance, and as a major figure in the development of telegraphy. His other contributions include the English concertina, the stereoscope (a device for displaying three-dimensional images) and the Playfair cipher (an encryption technique).

== Life ==
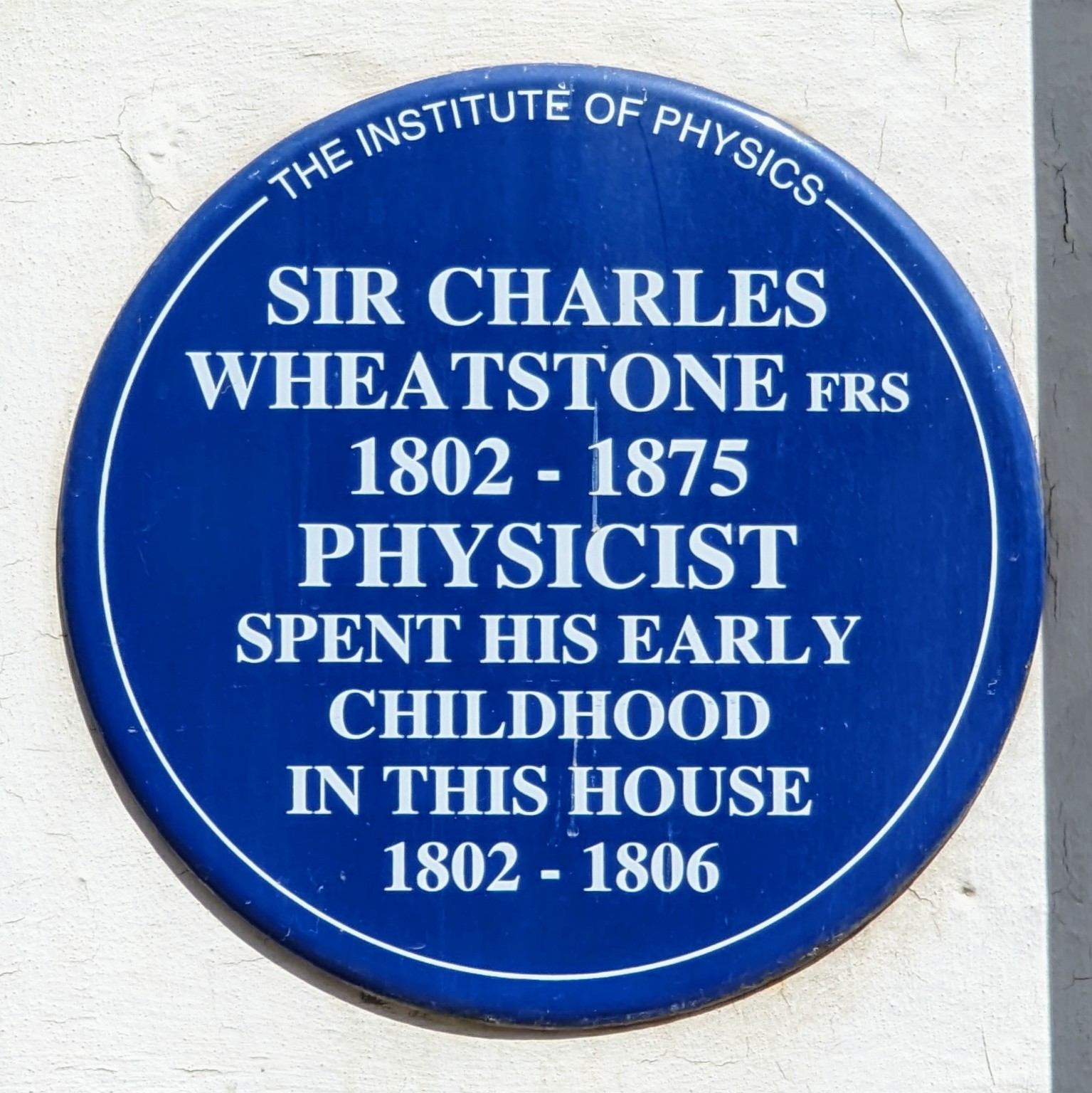
Plaque marking a childhood house in Gloucester

Charles Wheatstone was born in Westgate at. Gloucester and christened in St Mary de Lode. However some time after his death a biography confused the issue by relocating this to his grandmothers house in Barnwood, Gloucestershire. His father, W. Wheatstone, was a cobbler and music-seller in the town, but his mother descended from the lord of the manor in a nearby village and had links with London society. His father moved to 128 Pall Mall, London, four years later, becoming a teacher of the flute to royalty. Charles, the second son, stayed with his grand parents and went to a village school in Barnwood and afterwards to several institutions in London. One of them was in Kennington, and kept by a Mrs. Castlemaine, who was astonished at his rapid progress. From another he ran away, but was captured at Windsor, not far from the theatre of his practical telegraph. As a boy he was very shy and sensitive, liking to retreat into an attic, without any other company than his own thoughts.

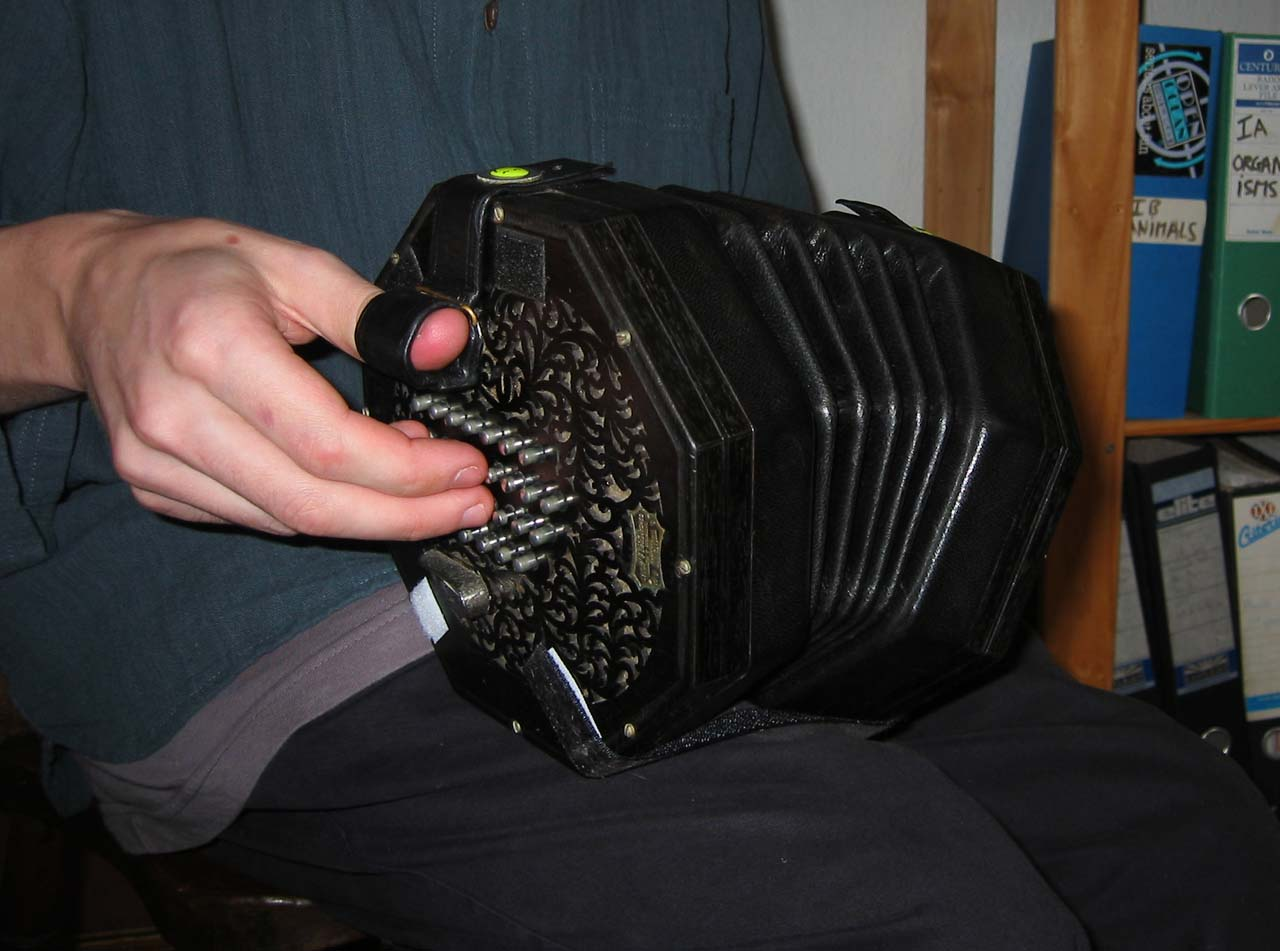
Wheatstone English concertina

When he was about fourteen years old he was apprenticed to his uncle and namesake, a maker and seller of musical instruments at 436 Strand, London; but he showed little taste for handicraft or business, and loved better to study books. His father encouraged him in this, and finally took him out of the uncle's charge.

At the age of fifteen, Wheatstone translated French poetry, and wrote two songs, one of which was given to his uncle, who published it without knowing it as his nephew's composition. Some lines of his on the lyre became the motto of an engraving by Bartolozzi. He often visited an old book-stall in the vicinity of Pall Mall, which was then a dilapidated and unpaved thoroughfare. Most of his pocket-money was spent in purchasing the books which had taken his fancy, whether fairy tales, history, or science.

One day, to the surprise of the bookseller, he coveted a volume on the discoveries of Volta in electricity, but not having the price, he saved his pennies and secured the volume. It was written in French, and so he was obliged to save again, until he could buy a dictionary. Then he began to read the volume, and, with the help of his elder brother, William, to repeat the experiments described in it, with a home-made battery, in the scullery behind his father's house. In constructing the battery, the boy philosophers ran short of money to procure the requisite copper-plates. They had only a few copper coins left. A happy thought occurred to Charles, who was the leading spirit in these researches, 'We must use the pennies themselves,' said he, and the battery was soon complete.

At Christchurch, Marylebone, on 12 February 1847, Wheatstone was married to Emma West. She was the daughter of a Taunton tradesman, and of handsome appearance. She died in 1866, leaving a family of five young children to his care. His domestic life was quiet and uneventful.

Though silent and reserved in public, Wheatstone was a clear and voluble talker in private, if taken on his favourite studies, and his small but active person, his plain but intelligent countenance, was full of animation. Sir Henry Taylor tells us that he once observed Wheatstone at an evening party in Oxford earnestly holding forth to Lord Palmerston on the capabilities of his telegraph. 'You don't say so!' exclaimed the statesman. 'I must get you to tell that to the Lord Chancellor.' And so saying, he fastened the electrician on Lord Westbury, and effected his escape. A reminiscence of this interview may have prompted Palmerston to remark that a time was coming when a minister might be asked in Parliament if war had broken out in India, and would reply, 'Wait a minute; I'll just telegraph to the Governor-General, and let you know.'

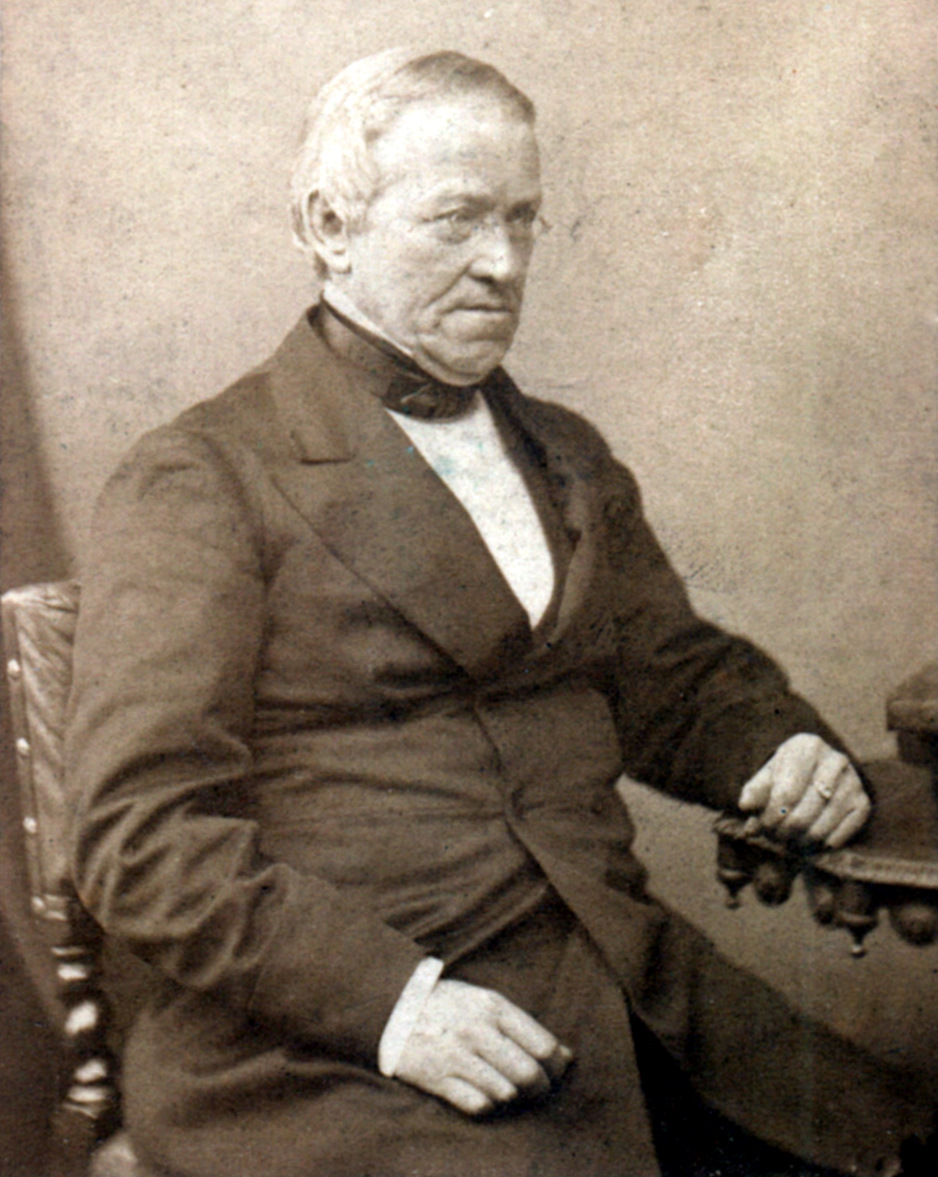
Wheatstone in later years

Wheatstone was knighted in 1868, after his completion of the automatic telegraph. He had previously been made a Chevalier of the Legion of Honour. Some thirty-four distinctions and diplomas of home or foreign societies bore witness to his scientific reputation. Since 1836 he had been a Fellow of the Royal Society, and in 1859 he was elected a foreign member of the Royal Swedish Academy of Sciences, and in 1873 a Foreign Associate of the French Academy of Sciences. The same year he was awarded the Ampere Medal by the French Society for the Encouragement of National Industry. In 1875 he was created an honorary member of the Institution of Civil Engineers. He was a D.C.L. of Oxford and an LL.D. of Cambridge.

While on a visit to Paris during the autumn of 1875, and engaged in perfecting his receiving instrument for submarine cables, he caught a cold, which produced inflammation of the lungs, an illness from which he died in Paris, on 19 October 1875 aged 73. A memorial service was held in the Anglican Chapel, Paris, and attended by a deputation of the academy. His remains were taken to his home in Park Crescent, London, (marked by a blue plaque today) and buried in Kensal Green Cemetery.

== Music instruments and acoustics ==
In September 1821, Wheatstone brought himself into public notice by exhibiting the 'Enchanted Lyre,' or 'Acoucryptophone,' at a music shop at Pall Mall and in the Adelaide Gallery. It consisted of a mimic lyre hung from the ceiling by a cord, and emitting the strains of several instruments – the piano, harp, and dulcimer. In reality it was a mere sounding box, and the cord was a steel rod that conveyed the vibrations of the music from the several instruments which were played out of sight and ear-shot. At this period Wheatstone made numerous experiments on sound and its transmission. Some of his results are preserved in Thomson's Annals of Philosophy for 1823.

He recognised that sound is propagated by waves or oscillations of the atmosphere, as light was then believed to be by undulations of the luminiferous ether. Water, and solid bodies, such as glass, or metal, or sonorous wood, convey the modulations with high velocity, and he conceived the plan of transmitting sound-signals, music, or speech to long distances by this means. He estimated that sound would travel 200 miles per second (320 km/s) through solid rods, and proposed to telegraph from London to Edinburgh in this way. He even called his arrangement a 'telephone.' (Robert Hooke, in his Micrographia, published in 1667, writes: 'I can assure the reader that I have, by the help of a distended wire, propagated the sound to a very considerable distance in an instant, or with as seemingly quick a motion as that of light.' Nor was it essential the wire should be straight; it might be bent into angles. This property is the basis of the mechanical or lover's telephone, said to have been known to the Chinese many centuries ago. Hooke also considered the possibility of finding a way to quicken our powers of hearing.)

A writer in the Repository of Arts for 1 September 1821, in referring to the 'Enchanted Lyre,' beholds the prospect of an opera being performed at the King's Theatre, and enjoyed at the Hanover Square Rooms, or even at the Horns Tavern, Kennington. The vibrations are to travel through underground conductors, like to gas in pipes.

And if music be capable of being thus conducted,' he observes, 'perhaps the words of speech may be susceptible of the same means of propagation. The eloquence of counsel, the debates of Parliament, instead of being read the next day only, – But we shall lose ourselves in the pursuit of this curious subject.

Besides transmitting sounds to a distance, Wheatstone devised a simple instrument for augmenting feeble sounds, to which he gave the name of 'Microphone.' It consisted of two slender rods, which conveyed the mechanical vibrations to both ears, and is quite different from the electrical microphone of Professor Hughes.

In 1823, his uncle, the musical instrument maker, died, and Wheatstone, with his elder brother, William, took over the business. Charles had no great liking for the commercial part, but his ingenuity found a vent in making improvements on the existing instruments, and in devising philosophical toys. He also invented instruments of his own. One of the most famous was the Wheatstone concertina. It was a six sided instrument with 64 keys, logically arranged for simple chromatic fingerings. The English concertina became increasingly famous throughout his lifetime, however it didn't reach its peak of popularity until the early 20th century. (Note: Unlike its status today as a folk instrument, in the 19th century the symphonium and concertina were considered appropriate for performance of serious music at high-class concerts.)

In 1827, Wheatstone introduced his 'kaleidophone', a device for rendering the vibrations of a sounding body apparent to the eye. It consists of a metal rod, carrying at its end a silvered bead, which reflects a 'spot' of light. As the rod vibrates the spot is seen to describe complicated figures in the air, like a spark whirled about in the darkness. His photometer was probably suggested by this appliance. It enables two lights to be compared by the relative brightness of their reflections in a silvered bead, which describes a narrow ellipse, so as to draw the spots into parallel lines.

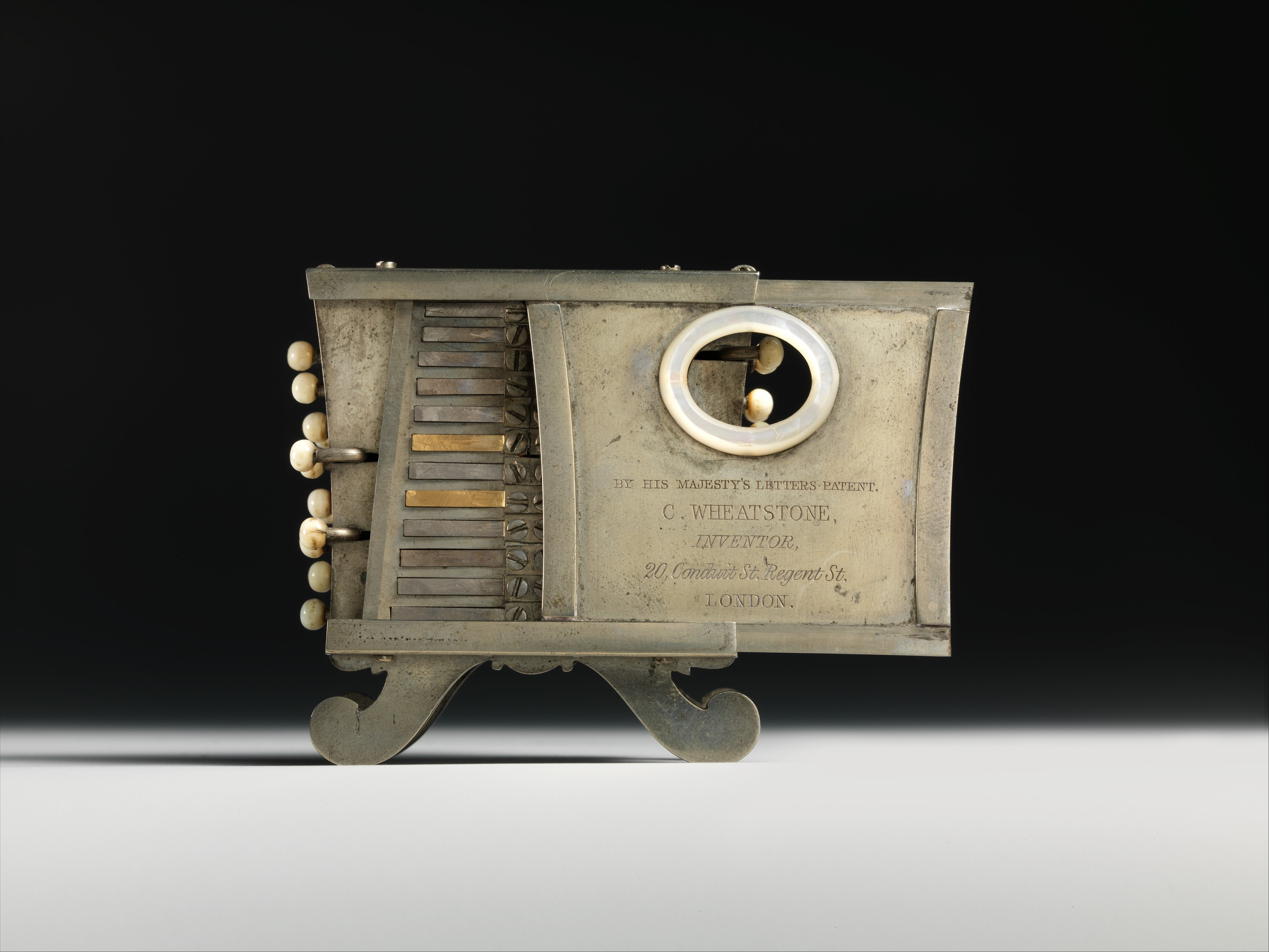
Symphonium

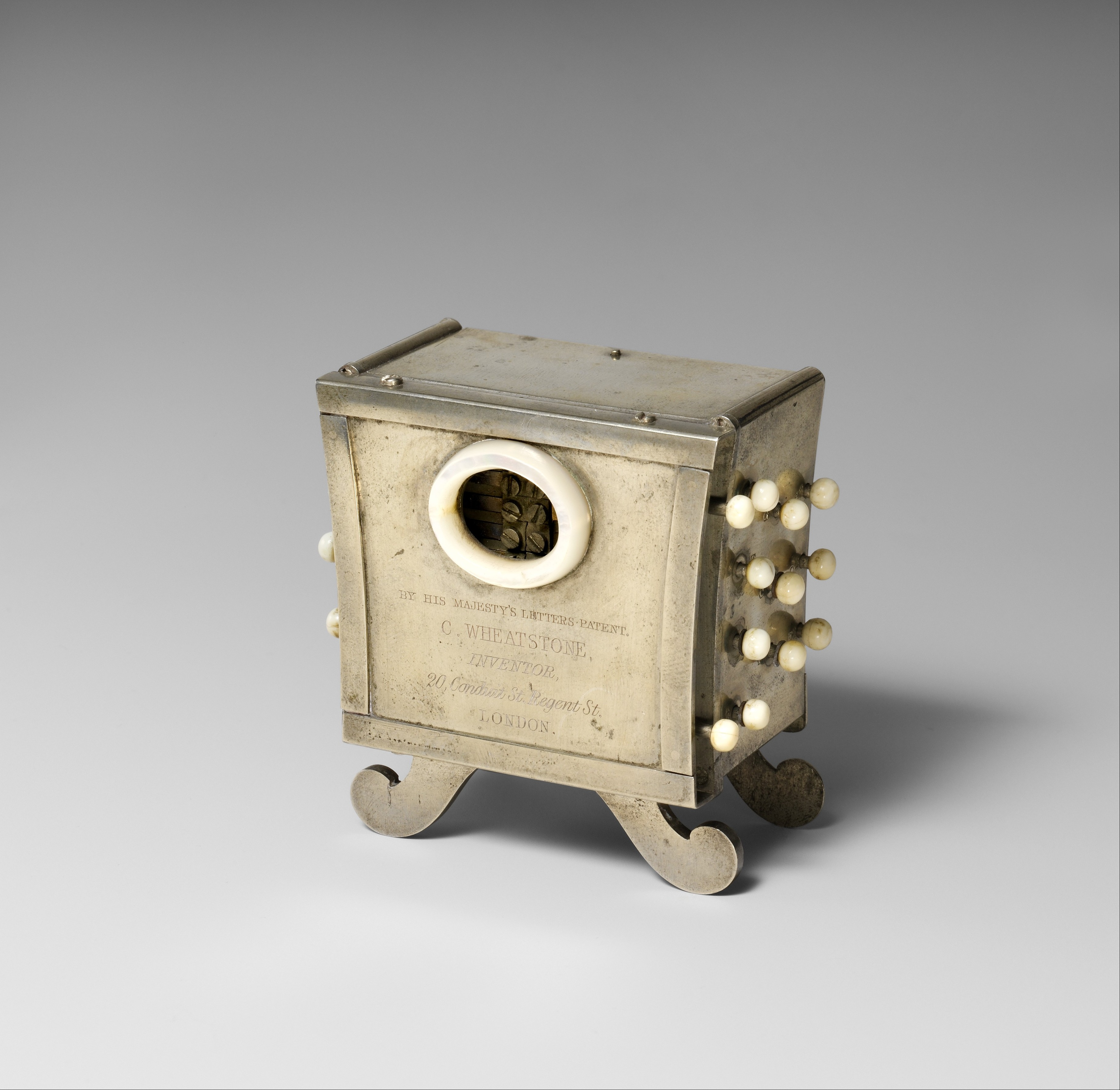
Symphonium

In 1828, Wheatstone improved the German wind instrument, called the Mundharmonika, creating the symphonium (or symphonion (Note: "Symphonion" was later applied to a quite different instrument – a sort of music box played by a large perforated disc rather than a small spiked drum.)), a mouth-blown free-reed instrument with a logical layout of button keys, patented on 19 December 1829, prefiguring the bellows-blown English concertina. The portable harmonium is another of his inventions, which gained a prize medal at the Great Exhibition of 1851. He also improved the speaking machine of De Kempelen, and endorsed the opinion of Sir David Brewster, that before the end of this century a singing and talking apparatus would be among the conquests of science.

In 1834, Wheatstone, who had won a name for himself, was appointed to the Chair of Experimental Physics in King's College London. His first course of lectures on sound were a complete failure, due to his abhorrence of public speaking. In the rostrum he was tongue-tied and incapable, sometimes turning his back on the audience and mumbling to the diagrams on the wall. In the laboratory he felt himself at home, and ever after confined his duties mostly to demonstration.

== Velocity of electricity ==
He achieved renown by a great experiment made in 1834 – the measurement of the velocity of electricity in a wire. He cut the wire at the middle, to form a gap which a spark might leap across, and connected its ends to the poles of a Leyden jar filled with electricity. Three sparks were thus produced, one at each end of the wire, and another at the middle. He mounted a tiny mirror on the works of a watch, so that it revolved at a high velocity, and observed the reflections of his three sparks in it. The points of the wire were so arranged that if the sparks were instantaneous, their reflections would appear in one straight line; but the middle one was seen to lag behind the others, because it was an instant later. The electricity had taken a certain time to travel from the ends of the wire to the middle. This time was found by measuring the amount of lag, and comparing it with the known velocity of the mirror. Having got the time, he had only to compare that with the length of half the wire, and he could find the velocity of electricity. His results gave a calculated velocity of 288,000 miles per second, i.e. faster than what we now know to be the speed of light (299,792.458 kilometres per second (186,000 mi/s)), but were nonetheless an interesting approximation.

It was already appreciated by some scientists that the "velocity" of electricity was dependent on the properties of the conductor and its surroundings. Francis Ronalds had observed signal retardation in his buried electric telegraph cable (but not his airborne line) in 1816 and outlined its cause to be induction. Wheatstone witnessed these experiments as a youth, which were apparently a stimulus for his own research in telegraphy. Decades later, after the telegraph had been commercialised, Michael Faraday described how the velocity of an electric field in a submarine wire, coated with insulator and surrounded with water, is only 144,000 miles per second (232,000 km/s), or still less.

Wheatstone's device of the revolving mirror was afterwards employed by Léon Foucault and Hippolyte Fizeau to measure the relative speeds of light in air versus water, and later to measure the speed of light.

== Spectroscopy ==
Wheatstone and others also contributed to early spectroscopy through the discovery and exploitation of spectral emission lines.

As John Munro wrote in 1891, "In 1835, at the Dublin meeting of the British Association, Wheatstone showed that when metals were volatilised in the electric spark, their light, examined through a prism, revealed certain rays which were characteristic of them. Thus the kind of metals which formed the sparking points could be determined by analysing the light of the spark. This suggestion has been of great service in spectrum analysis, and as applied by Robert Bunsen, Gustav Robert Kirchhoff, and others, has led to the discovery of several new elements, such as rubidium and thallium, as well as increasing our knowledge of the heavenly bodies."

== Telegraph ==
Wheatstone abandoned his idea of transmitting intelligence by the mechanical vibration of rods, and took up the electric telegraph. In 1835 he lectured on the system of Baron Schilling, and declared that the means were already known by which an electric telegraph could be made of great service to the world. He made experiments with a plan of his own, and not only proposed to lay an experimental line across the Thames, but to establish it on the London and Birmingham Railway. Before these plans were carried out, however, he received a visit from William Cooke at his house in Conduit Street on 27 February 1837, which had an important influence on his future.

=== Cooperation with Cooke ===
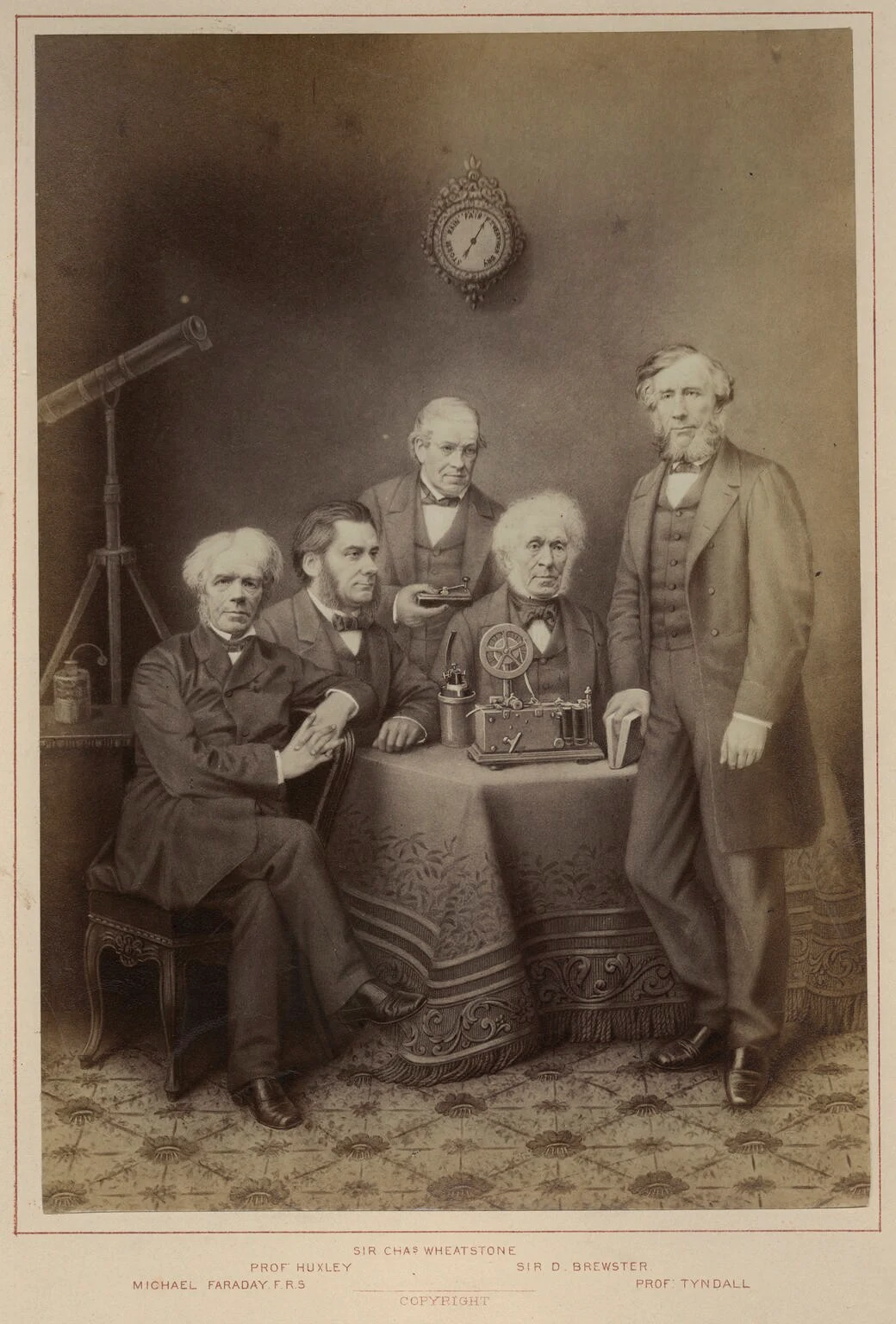
"Scientists". Photograph of (left to right): Michael Faraday, Thomas Henry Huxley, Charles Wheatstone, David Brewster, John Tyndall, published by Hughes & Edmonds in 1876

Cooke was an officer in the Madras Army, who, being home on leave, was attending some lectures on anatomy at the University of Heidelberg, where, on 6 March 1836, he witnessed a demonstration with the telegraph of professor Georg Munke, and was so impressed with its importance, that he forsook his medical studies and devoted all his efforts to the work of introducing the telegraph. He returned to London soon after, and was able to exhibit a telegraph with three needles in January 1837. Feeling his want of scientific knowledge, he consulted Michael Faraday and Peter Roget (then secretary of the Royal Society): Roget sent him to Wheatstone.

At a second interview, Cooke told Wheatstone of his intention to bring out a working telegraph, and explained his method. Wheatstone, according to his own statement, remarked to Cooke that the method would not act, and produced his own experimental telegraph. Finally, Cooke proposed that they should enter into a partnership, but Wheatstone was at first reluctant to comply. He was a well-known man of science, and had meant to publish his results without seeking to make capital of them. Cooke, on the other hand, declared that his sole object was to make a fortune from the scheme. In May they agreed to join their forces, Wheatstone contributing the scientific, and Cooke the administrative talent. The deed of partnership was dated 19 November 1837. A joint patent was taken out for their inventions, including the five-needle telegraph of Wheatstone, and an alarm worked by a relay, in which the current, by dipping a needle into mercury, completed a local circuit, and released the detent of a clockwork.

The five-needle telegraph, which was mainly, if not entirely, due to Wheatstone, was similar to that of Schilling, and based on the principle enunciated by Ampère – that is to say, the current was sent into the line by completing the circuit of the battery with a make and break key, and at the other end it passed through a coil of wire surrounding a magnetic needle free to turn round its centre. According as one pole of the battery or the other was applied to the line by means of the key, the current deflected the needle to one side or the other. There were five separate circuits actuating five different needles. The latter were pivoted in rows across the middle of a dial shaped like a diamond, and having the letters of the alphabet arranged upon it in such a way that a letter was literally pointed out by the current deflecting two of the needles towards it.

=== Early installations ===
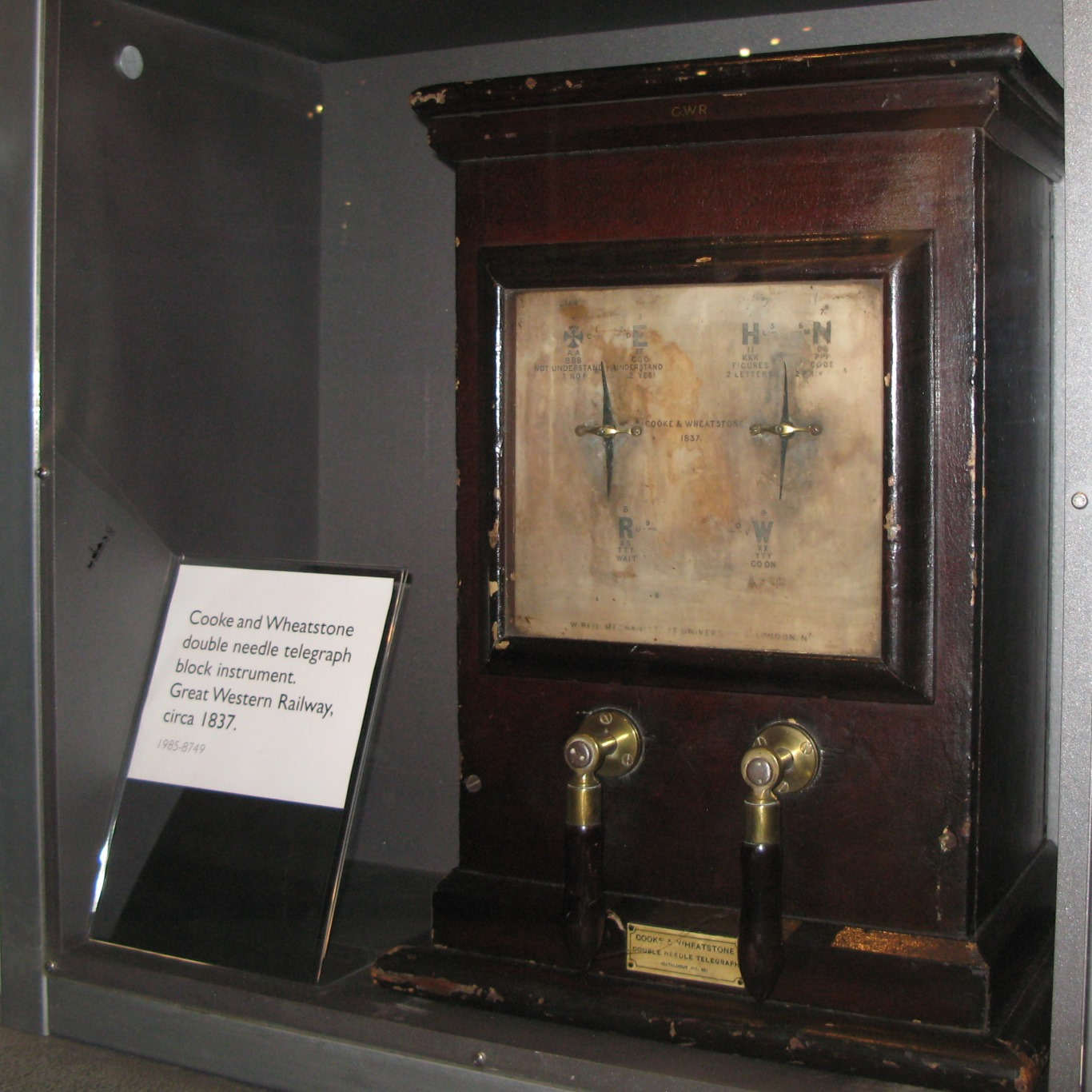
A double-needle telegraph instrument of the type used on the Great Western Railway

An experimental line, with a sixth return wire, was run between the Euston terminus and Camden Town station of the London and North Western Railway on 25 July 1837. The actual distance was only one and a half-miles (2.4 km), but spare wire had been inserted in the circuit to increase its length. It was late in the evening before the trial took place. Cooke was in charge at Camden Town, while Robert Stephenson and other gentlemen looked on; and Wheatstone sat at his instrument in a dingy little room, lit by a tallow candle, near the booking-office at Euston. Wheatstone sent the first message, to which Cooke replied: and "never" said Wheatstone, "did I feel such a tumultuous sensation before, as when, all alone in the still room, I heard the needles click, and as I spelled the words, I felt all the magnitude of the invention pronounced to be practicable beyond cavil or dispute."

In spite of this trial, however, the directors of the railway treated the 'new-fangled' invention with indifference, and requested its removal. In July 1839, however, it was favoured by the Great Western Railway, and a line erected from the Paddington station terminus to West Drayton railway station, a distance of thirteen miles (21 km). Part of the wire was laid underground at first, but subsequently all of it was raised on posts along the line. Their circuit was eventually extended to Slough in 1841, and was publicly exhibited at Paddington as a marvel of science, which could transmit fifty signals a distance of 280,000 miles per minute (7,500 km/s). The price of admission was a shilling (£0.05), and in 1844 one fascinated observer recorded the following:

It is perfect from the terminus of the Great Western as far as Slough – that is, eighteen miles; the wires being in some places underground in tubes, and in others high up in the air, which last, he says, is by far the best plan. We asked if the weather did not affect the wires, but he said not; a violent thunderstorm might ring a bell, but no more. We were taken into a small room (we being Mrs Drummond, Miss Philips, Harry Codrington and myself – and afterwards the Milmans and Mr Rich) where were several wooden cases containing different sorts of telegraphs. In one sort every word was spelt, and as each letter was placed in turn in a particular position, the machinery caused the electric fluid to run down the line, where it made the letter show itself at Slough, by what machinery he could not undertake to explain. After each word came a sign from Slough, signifying "I understand", coming certainly in less than one second from the end of the word......Another prints the messages it brings, so that if no-one attended to the bell,....the message would not be lost. This is effected by the electrical fluid causing a little hammer to strike the letter which presents itself, the letter which is raised hits some manifold writing paper (a new invention, black paper which, if pressed, leaves an indelible black mark), by which means the impression is left on white paper beneath. This was the most ingenious of all, and apparently Mr. Wheatstone's favourite; he was very good-natured in explaining but understands it so well himself that he cannot feel how little we know about it, and goes too fast for such ignorant folk to follow him in everything. Mrs Drummond told me he is wonderful for the rapidity with which he thinks and his power of invention; he invents so many things that he cannot put half his ideas into execution, but leaves them to be picked up and used by others, who get the credit of them.

=== Public attention and success ===
The public took to the new invention after the capture of the murderer John Tawell, who in 1845, had become the first person to be arrested as the result of telecommunications technology. In the same year, Wheatstone introduced two improved forms of the apparatus, namely, the 'single' and the 'double' needle instruments, in which the signals were made by the successive deflections of the needles. Of these, the single-needle instrument, requiring only one wire, is still in use.

The development of the telegraph may be gathered from two facts. In 1855, the death of the Emperor Nicholas at St. Petersburg, about one o'clock in the afternoon, was announced in the House of Lords a few hours later. The result of The Oaks of 1890 was received in New York fifteen seconds after the horses passed the winning-post.

=== Differences with Cooke ===
In 1841 a difference arose between Cooke and Wheatstone as to the share of each in the honour of inventing the telegraph. The question was submitted to the arbitration of the famous engineer, Marc Isambard Brunel, on behalf of Cooke, and Professor Daniell, of King's College, the inventor of the Daniell cell, on the part of Wheatstone. They awarded to Cooke the credit of having introduced the telegraph as a useful undertaking which promised to be of national importance, and to Wheatstone that of having by his researches prepared the public to receive it. They concluded with the words: 'It is to the united labours of two gentlemen so well qualified for mutual assistance that we must attribute the rapid progress which this important invention has made during five years since they have been associated.' The decision, however vague, pronounces the needle telegraph a joint production. If it had mainly been invented by Wheatstone, it was chiefly introduced by Cooke. Their respective shares in the undertaking might be compared to that of an author and his publisher, but for the fact that Cooke himself had a share in the actual work of invention.

=== Further work on telegraphs ===
From 1836 to 1837 Wheatstone had thought a good deal about submarine telegraphs, and in 1840 he gave evidence before the Railway Committee of the House of Commons on the feasibility of the proposed line from Dover to Calais. He had even designed the machinery for making and laying the cable. In the autumn of 1844, with the assistance of J. D. Llewellyn, he submerged a length of insulated wire in Swansea Bay, and signalled through it from a boat to the Mumbles Lighthouse. Next year he suggested the use of gutta-percha for the coating of the intended wire across the English Channel.

In 1840 Wheatstone had patented an alphabetical telegraph, or, 'Wheatstone A B C instrument,' which moved with a step-by-step motion, and showed the letters of the message upon a dial. The same principle was used in his type-printing telegraph, patented in 1841. This was the first apparatus which printed a telegram in type. It was worked by two circuits, and as the type revolved a hammer, actuated by the current, pressed the required letter on the paper.

The introduction of the telegraph had so far advanced that, on 2 September 1845, the Electric Telegraph Company was registered, and Wheatstone, by his deed of partnership with Cooke, received a sum of £33,000 for the use of their joint inventions.

In 1859 Wheatstone was appointed by the Board of Trade to report on the subject of the Atlantic cables, and in 1864 he was one of the experts who advised the Atlantic Telegraph Company on the construction of the successful lines of 1865 and 1866.

In 1870 the electric telegraph lines of the United Kingdom, worked by different companies, were transferred to the Post Office, and placed under Government control.

Wheatstone further invented the automatic transmitter, in which the signals of the message are first punched out on a strip of paper (punched tape), which is then passed through the sending-key, and controls the signal currents. By substituting a mechanism for the hand in sending the message, he was able to telegraph about 100 words a minute, or five times the ordinary rate. In the Postal Telegraph service this apparatus is employed for sending Press telegrams, and it has recently been so much improved, that messages are now sent from London to Bristol at a speed of 600 words a minute, and even of 400 words a minute between London and Aberdeen. On the night of 8 April 1886, when Gladstone introduced his Bill for Home Rule in Ireland, no fewer than 1,500,000 words were dispatched from the central station at St. Martin's-le-Grand by 100 Wheatstone transmitters. The plan of sending messages by a running strip of paper which actuates the key was originally patented by Alexander Bain in 1846; but Wheatstone, aided by Augustus Stroh, an accomplished mechanician, and an able experimenter, was the first to bring the idea into successful operation. This system is often referred to as the Wheatstone Perforator and is the forerunner of the stock market ticker tape.

== Optics ==
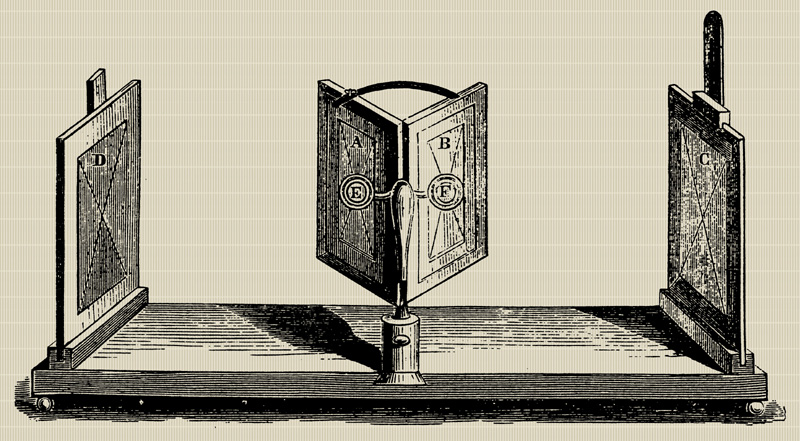
Charles Wheatstone mirror stereoscope

Stereopsis was first described by Wheatstone in 1838. In 1840 he was awarded the Royal Medal of the Royal Society for his explanation of binocular vision, a research which led him to make stereoscopic drawings and construct the stereoscope. He showed that our impression of solidity is gained by the combination in the mind of two separate pictures of an object taken by both of our eyes from different points of view. Thus, in the stereoscope, an arrangement of lenses or mirrors, two photographs of the same object taken from different points are so combined as to make the object stand out with a solid aspect. Sir David Brewster improved the stereoscope by dispensing with the mirrors, and bringing it into its existing form with lenses.

The 'pseudoscope' (Wheatstone coined the term from the Greek ψευδίς σκοπειν) was introduced in 1852, and is in some sort the reverse of the stereoscope, since it causes a solid object to seem hollow, and a nearer one to be farther off; thus, a bust appears to be a mask, and a tree growing outside of a window looks as if it were growing inside the room. Its purpose was to test his theory of stereo vision and for investigations into what would now be called experimental psychology.

== Measuring time ==
In 1840, Wheatstone introduced his chronoscope, for measuring minute intervals of time, which was used in determining the speed of a bullet or the passage of a star. In this apparatus an electric current actuated an electro-magnet, which noted the instant of an occurrence by means of a pencil on a moving paper. It is said to have been capable of distinguishing 1/7300 part of a second (137 microsecond), and the time a body took to fall from a height of one inch (25 mm).

On 26 November 1840, he exhibited his electro-magnetic clock in the library of the Royal Society, and propounded a plan for distributing the correct time from a standard clock to a number of local timepieces. The circuits of these were to be electrified by a key or contact-maker actuated by the arbour of the standard, and their hands corrected by electro-magnetism. The following January Alexander Bain took out a patent for an electro-magnetic clock, and he subsequently charged Wheatstone with appropriating his ideas. It appears that Bain worked as a mechanist to Wheatstone from August to December 1840, and he asserted that he had communicated the idea of an electric clock to Wheatstone during that period; but Wheatstone maintained that he had experimented in that direction during May. Bain further accused Wheatstone of stealing his idea of the electro-magnetic printing telegraph; but Wheatstone showed that the instrument was only a modification of his own electro-magnetic telegraph.

In 1840, Alexander Bain mentioned to the Mechanics Magazine editor his financial problems. The editor introduced him to Sir Charles Wheatstone. Bain demonstrated his models to Wheatstone, who, when asked for his opinion, said "Oh, I shouldn't bother to develop these things any further! There's no future in them." Three months later Wheatstone demonstrated an electric clock to the Royal Society, claiming it was his own invention. However, Bain had already applied for a patent for it. Wheatstone tried to block Bain's patents, but failed. When Wheatstone organised an Act of Parliament to set up the Electric Telegraph Company, the House of Lords summoned Bain to give evidence, and eventually compelled the company to pay Bain £10,000 and give him a job as manager, causing Wheatstone to resign.

=== Polar clock ===
One of Wheatstone's most ingenious devices was the 'Polar clock,' exhibited at the meeting of the British Association in 1848. It is based on the fact discovered by Sir David Brewster, that the light of the sky is polarised in a plane at an angle of ninety degrees from the position of the sun. It follows that by discovering that plane of polarisation, and measuring its azimuth with respect to the north, the position of the sun, although beneath the horizon, could be determined, and the apparent solar time obtained.

The clock consisted of a spyglass, having a Nicol (double-image) prism for an eyepiece, and a thin plate of selenite for an object-glass. When the tube was directed to the North Pole—that is, parallel to the Earth's axis—and the prism of the eyepiece turned until no colour was seen, the angle of turning, as shown by an index moving with the prism over a graduated limb, gave the hour of day. The device is of little service in a country where watches are reliable; but it formed part of the equipment of the 1875–1876 North Polar expedition commanded by Captain Nares.

== Wheatstone bridge ==
In 1843 Wheatstone communicated an important paper to the Royal Society, entitled 'An Account of Several New Processes for Determining the Constants of a Voltaic Circuit.' It contained an exposition of the well known balance for measuring the electrical resistance of a conductor, which still goes by the name of Wheatstone's Bridge or balance, although it was first devised by Samuel Hunter Christie, of the Royal Military Academy, Woolwich, who published it in the Philosophical Transactions for 1833. The method was neglected until Wheatstone brought it into notice.

His paper abounds with simple and practical formulae for the calculation of currents and resistances by the law of Ohm. He introduced a unit of resistance, namely, a foot of copper wire weighing one hundred grains (6.5 g), and showed how it might be applied to measure the length of wire by its resistance. He was awarded a medal for his paper by the Society. The same year he invented an apparatus which enabled the reading of a thermometer or a barometer to be registered at a distance by means of an electric contact made by the mercury. A sound telegraph, in which the signals were given by the strokes of a bell, was also patented by Cooke and Wheatstone in May of that year.

== Cryptography ==
Wheatstone's remarkable ingenuity was also displayed in the invention of ciphers. He was responsible for the then unusual Playfair cipher, named after his friend Lord Playfair. It was used by the militaries of several nations through at least World War I, and is known to have been used during World War II by British intelligence services.

It was initially resistant to cryptanalysis, but methods were eventually developed to break it. He also became involved in the interpretation of cipher manuscripts in the British Museum. He devised a cryptograph or machine for turning a message into cipher which could only be interpreted by putting the cipher into a corresponding machine adjusted to decrypt it.

As an amateur mathematician, Wheatstone published a mathematical proof in 1854 (see Cube (algebra)).

== Electrical generators ==
In 1840, Wheatstone brought out his magneto-electric machine for generating continuous currents.

On 4 February 1867, he published the principle of reaction in the dynamo-electric machine by a paper to the Royal Society; but Mr. C. W. Siemens had communicated the identical discovery ten days earlier, and both papers were read on the same day.

It afterwards appeared that Werner von Siemens, Samuel Alfred Varley, and Wheatstone had independently arrived at the principle within a few months of each other. Varley patented it on 24 December 1866; Siemens called attention to it on 17 January 1867; and Wheatstone exhibited it in action at the Royal Society on the above date.

== Disputes over invention ==
Wheatstone was involved in various disputes with other scientists throughout his life regarding his role in different technologies and appeared at times to take more credit than he was due. As well as William Fothergill Cooke, Alexander Bain and David Brewster, mentioned above, these also included Francis Ronalds at the Kew Observatory. Wheatstone was erroneously believed by many to have created the atmospheric electricity observing apparatus that Ronalds invented and developed at the observatory in the 1840s and also to have installed the first automatic recording meteorological instruments there (see for example, Howarth, p158).

== Personal life ==
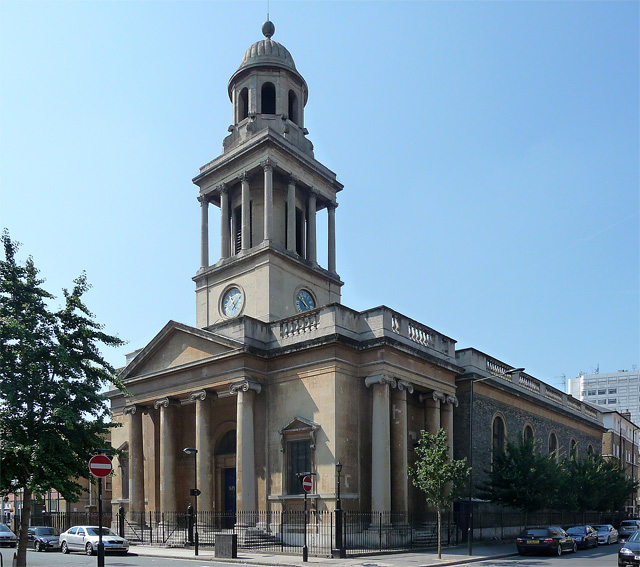
Christ Church, Marylebone

Wheatstone married Emma West, spinster, a daughter of John Hooke West, deceased, at Christ Church, Marylebone, on 12 February 1847. The marriage was by licence.

== Legacy ==
In 1994 British Rail Class 20 locomotive 20187 was named Sir Charles Wheatstone by British Rail Telecommunications.

== See also ==
- William Fothergill Cooke
- Oliver Heaviside
