= Samuel Hunter Christie =

British physicist and mathematician (1784–1865)

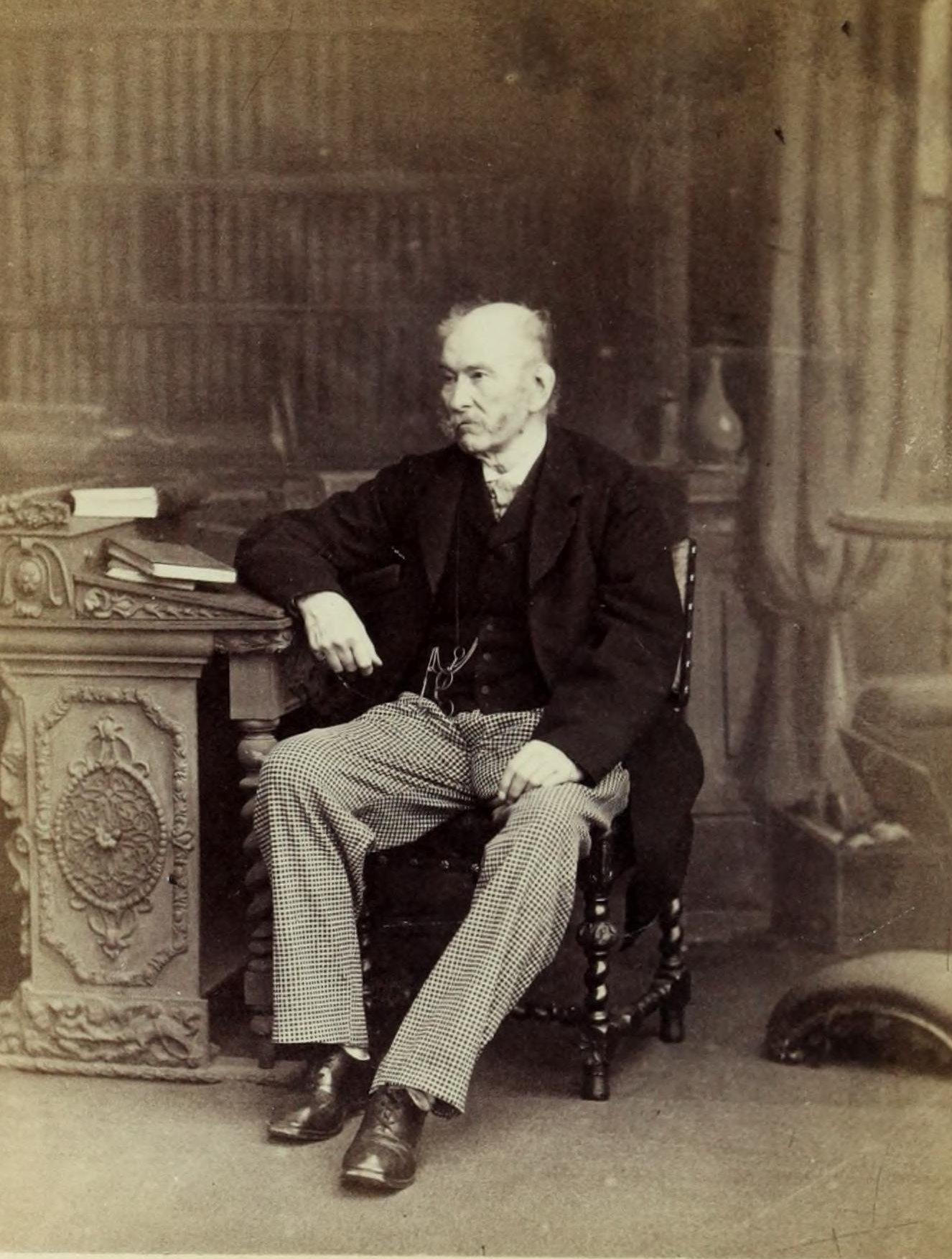
- Born: 22 March 1784; London, England, Great Britain
- Died: 24 January 1865 (aged 80); Twickenham, England, UK
- Education: Trinity College, Cambridge
- Occupation: Professor
- Known for: First proposing the Wheatstone bridge
- Awards: Bakerian Medal (1833); FRS (1826); Smith's Prize (1805)

Samuel Hunter Christie FRS (22 March 1784 – 24 January 1865) was a British physicist and mathematician.

== Life ==
He studied mathematics at Trinity College, Cambridge, where he won the Smith's Prize and was second wrangler. He was particularly interested in magnetism, studying the Earth's magnetic field and designing improvements to the magnetic compass. Some of his magnetic research was done in collaboration with Peter Barlow. He became a Fellow of the Royal Society in 1826, delivered their Bakerian Lecture in 1833 and served as their Secretary from 1837 to 1853. In 1833 he published his 'diamond' method, the forerunner of the Wheatstone bridge, in a paper on the magnetic and electrical properties of metals, as a method for comparing the resistances of wires of different thicknesses. However, the method went unrecognised until 1843, when Charles Wheatstone proposed it, in another paper for the Royal Society, for measuring resistance in electrical circuits. Although Wheatstone presented it as Christie's invention, it is his name, rather than Christie's, that is now associated with the device.

Christie taught mathematics at the Royal Military Academy, Woolwich, from 1838 until his retirement in 1854. He died at Twickenham, on 24 January 1865.

A portrait photograph of Christie in 1865 by Ernest Edwards is held by the National Portrait Gallery.

== Family ==
He had ten children (five with each wife), of whom eight survived him. His eldest son with his second wife was the astronomer William Henry Mahoney Christie (1845–1922).

Samuel Christie is the son of one James Christie

== Marriages ==
1. Elizabeth Theadora (died c.1844; source: Posting on RootsWeb)
2. Margaret Ellen (married c.1844; source: Woolwich churchyard inscription)

== Sources ==
- 'Leicester Square, West Side: Leicester Estate: Nos 43–54 Leicester Square', Survey of London: volumes 33 and 34: St Anne Soho (1966), pp. 507–514.
- James, Frank A. J. L. (2004). "Christie, Samuel Hunter (1784–1865)". Oxford Dictionary of National Biography. Oxford University Press.
