= Augustus Stroh =

Johannes Matthias Augustus Stroh (7 May 1828 – 2 November 1914) was a German-born English engineer and inventor. He invented sound-recording and sound-producing devices including a musical instrument known as the Stroh violin.

Stroh was born in Frankfurt-am-Main, Germany. After school, he became an apprentice to a clockmaker, with a talent for mechanical devices. In 1851, he visited the Great Exhibition in Hyde Park, London and was so impressed by the scientific institutions of London that he stayed back and later became a naturalized British citizen. He was introduced to Sir Charles Wheatstone with whom he worked on a number of telegraphy instruments including the A.B.C. Telegraph which was popular until 1878. He was involved in what later became better known as the "Wheatstone Automatic" system. In 1860 he was involved in the enterprise of Wheatstone and Stroh instruments. He was able to sell many of his patents in 1880 to the postal office and set up a home and workshop in Haverstock Hill. In 1881, he saw demonstrations by Carl Bjerknes at the Paris Electrical Exhibition and began to conduct experiments on electromagnetism and vibrations. He became a member of the Institution of Electrical Engineers in 1875, after being proposed by Wildman Whitehouse and seconded by Carl Becker, Frederick Abel, Robert Sabine, George Preece and Frank Bolton. He served in the council from 1880 to 1889, as auditor from 1890 to 1897 and served as a British delegate to the Paris Electrical Congress in 1881. Stroh had a large collection of watches and chronometers and he also began to work on electrical clocks from the 1860s. He improved upon the phonograph of Edison. In 1872 he developed a musical instrument that sought to replicate the human voice. He gave a talk and demonstration of the instrument at the Royal Institution on 17 February 1879 titled "On studies in acoustics: a synthetic examination of vowel sounds." He was also interested in photography and stereoscopy for which he developed some instruments.

Stroh was a member of the Physical Society, the Royal Institution, the Camera Club and the Societe Internationale des Electriciens. He married Emma King in 1860 and they had a son and two daughters. He died at his home in Haverstock Hill and was buried in Hampstead Cemetery.
