= Tungsten (music) =

Type of phonograph pickup stylus

A Tungsten or Tungs-Tone is a type of phonograph stylus. Constructed from tungsten wire, held in a metal shank, a tungsten stylus differs from a steel stylus in that it has a cylindrical rather than a conical shape, meaning that the cross-section of the stylus remains the same as the stylus wears down improving durability to several plays.

Typically, a new steel needle is required for every record played on an old acoustic phonograph. This is because the record contains abrasive material. In the first few silent tracks this abrasion hones the steel needle to a profile that tracks the grooves properly. The needle continues to wear as it plays the record, so that by the end its diameter has increased to the point where the sharp edges may damage the grooves on subsequent plays.

One famous brand of tungsten stylus was the Tungs-Tone stylus, manufactured by the Victor Talking Machine Company in the 1910s and 1920s.

== See also ==
- Romanian horn-violin
