= Kleinschmidt keyboard perforator =

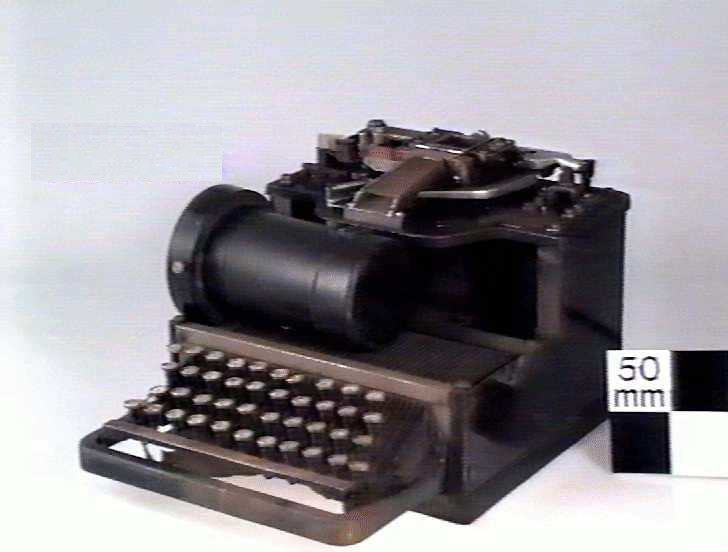
Kleinschmidt telegraph tape perforator from Museums Victoria Collections

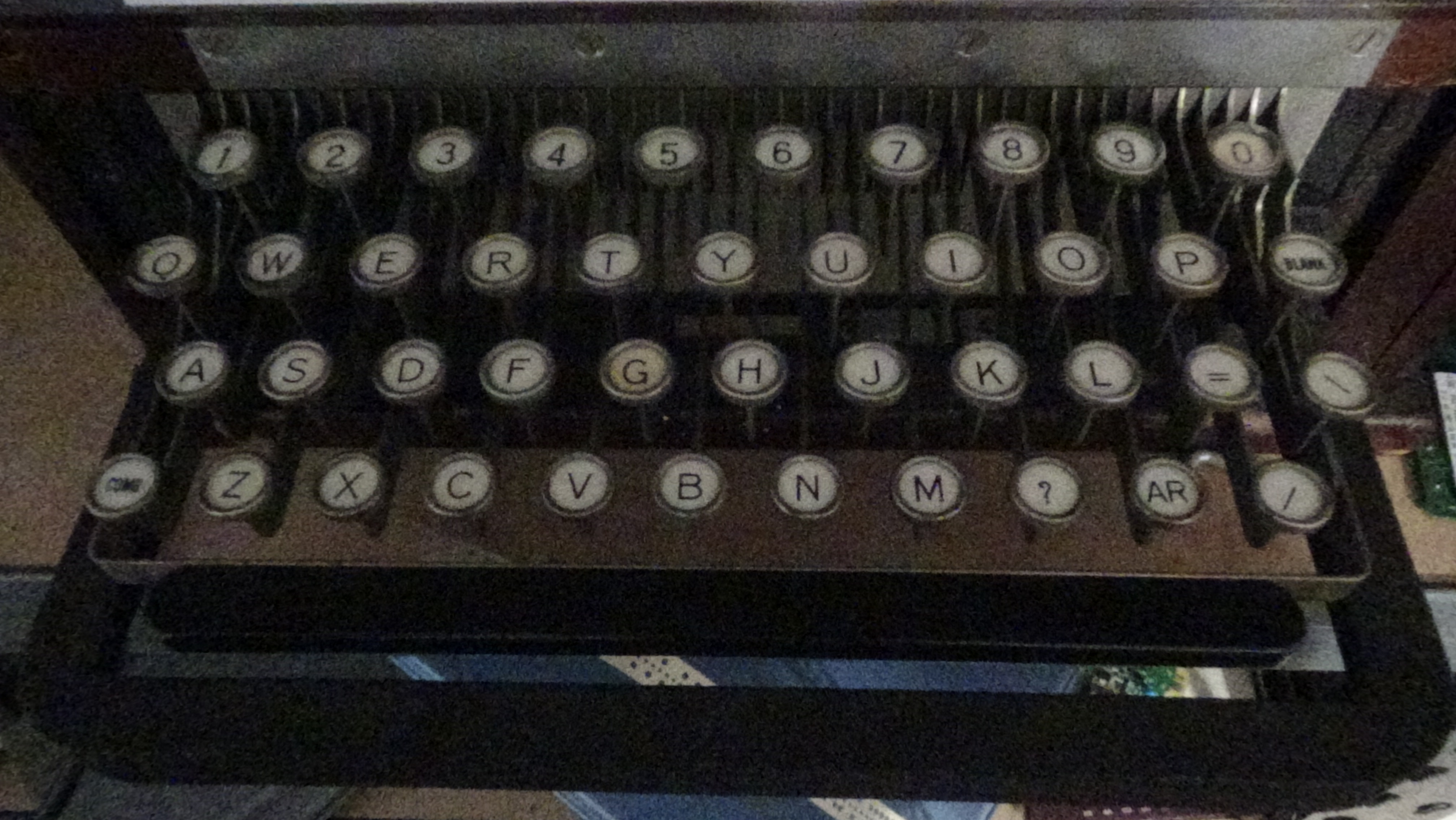
Keyboard

The Kleinschmidt keyboard perforator is a telegraph instrument invented by Edward Kleinschmidt which prepares punched tape for telegraph transmission. A QWERTY keyboard operate hole punches that prepare a Wheatstone slip. Each Morse code of the dots and dashes for the letter is selected by projecting tongues on the key bar. The centre holes used for the paper feed are punched first, then the lower holes, and then the upper holes. The upper holes are the mark holes, which indicate when the symbol (dot or dash) starts, and the lower hole tell when to terminate the symbol. This keyboard can be operated at up to 80 words a minute by a skilled operator.

The Kleinschmidt keyboard perforator was first invented and constructed by Kleinschmidt in 1911. Kleinschmidt wanted to develop a product that could be sold to telegraph companies rather than just selling patents. Western Union Telegraph Company was the first customer, purchasing 50 units. Following this order, the Kleinschmidt Electric Company was formed to manufacture the perforator. F. G. Creed ordered ten machines for the "Creed high-speed Continental Morse code system". The British Post Office ordered 20, and then later in 1914 ordered another 100. Later the Teletype Corporation also made this machine.

In London they were sold by Creed & Co, which had a sales contract with the Kleinschmidt Electric Company.
