= Wheatstone system =

Automated telegraph system

The Wheatstone system was an automated telegraph system that replaced a human operator with machines capable of sending and recording Morse code at a consistent fast rate. The system included a perforator, which prepared punched paper tape called a Wheatstone slip, a transmitter that read the tape and converted the symbols into dots and dashes encoded as mark and space electric currents on the telegraph line, and a receiver at the other end of the telegraph line that printed the Morse symbols. The system was invented by Charles Wheatstone. Enhancements could be made so that it was a duplex system, able to send and receive on the same line simultaneously.

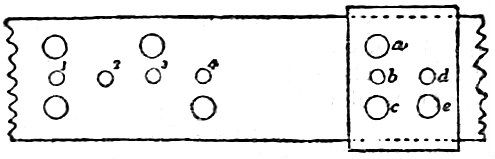
Wheatstone slip with a dot, space and a dash punched, and perforator punch plate

⠂	inter-letter space
⠒	inter-word space
⠇	dot
⠳	dash

The Wheatstone slip was a paper tape that contained holes in a pattern to control the mark and space signals on the telegraph line. The paper tape was from 0.46 to 0.48 inches in width, (but the standard width is from 0.472 to 0.475 inches) and a standard thickness of 0.004 to 0.0045 inches. Olive oil coating lubricated the punch process. There were three rows of holes. The middle row forms a rack so that a star wheel can move the paper forward. Every used position on the tape has a middle hole punched. The top hole indicates when to turn on the mark signal on the line, and the bottom hole says to turn off the mark signal. Each vertical column represents a time interval in the Morse code, including the spacing between the holes. The holes are spaced 0.1 inches apart. A column of three holes turns on the mark at the beginning of the interval, and turns it off at the end making a dot. If there is a top hole without a bottom, and then the next column has a bottom without a top hole, mark is on for three intervals, and a dash is represented. If there is only a centre hole, then nothing changes, and this would normally be used to put in space between letters and words.

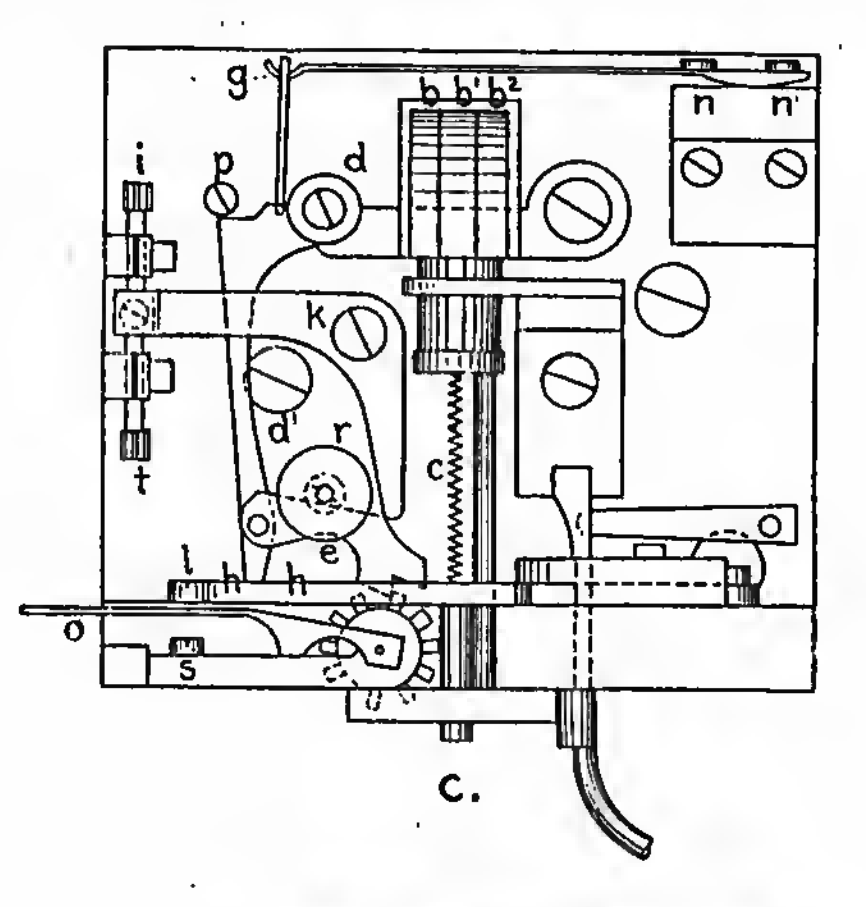
Mallet or Wheatstone perforator internal diagram with cover removed

The Wheatstone perforator was a development of Alexander Bain's 1848 manually operated hole punch machine for his "fast telegraph". It produced Wheatstone slips using three buttons (or keys) labelled "A", "A1" and "A2". "A" punched the pattern for dot, "A1" punched the pattern for space, and "A2" punched the dash pattern in two columns. The keys were so difficult to press that fist-held rubber-tipped mallets were used to depress them and operate the punches. Using this, invalid combinations of holes could not be produced. The blank paper tape was fed in from the right over a roller and came out the left side. It was oriented in a vertical plane. The paper punches were labelled with numbers: 1 for the top hole of the dot, 2 for the sprocket hole for dot, and 3 for the bottom hole for dot. When a dash was punched, extra hole punches to the right punched a centre hole with number 4 and a bottom hole with number 5. The perforator was introduced in 1867. It enabled transmission speeds on a telegraph line to increase to 70 words per minute. The very first message ever punched onto a tape was "SOS EIOS". The manual perforator was subsequently replaced by keyboard perforators like the Gell keyboard perforator or Kleinschmidt keyboard perforator.

Each of the keys had a spring to restore its position after pressing. Each key moved a corresponding lever underneath the instrument. The other end of the levers protruded up into the back of the mechanism. Each punch rod also had a spring to put it back in place after punching a hole. For space and dot keying (A or A1) the star wheel was only allowed to turn one position by a pawl, and the paper tape only moved forward one position. However, when key A2 was hit, the corresponding lever B2 raised a bar (h) which allowed another lever attached to the pawl to move further back when the star wheel rotated, and the wheel could turn two positions, for a dash. The distance the paper tape moved for each position was determined by how far lever k moved, and its range of movement had to be set by adjusting screws i and t. A flat spring g stored energy from the punch to move the paper. The force of the spring was determined by adjusting screws n and n'. A guide roller (r) with a groove was pressed by an adjustable spring to press the pawl against the star wheel. The star wheel was on a frame with a piece sticking out the left hand side as a lever. When the operator wanted to insert paper tape, this lever was pulled, and the star wheel retracted from the paper.

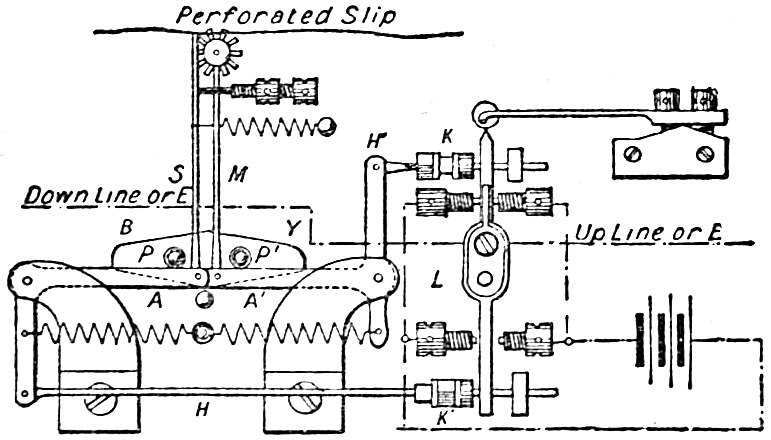
Wheatstone automatic transmitter diagram

The Wheatstone transmitter read a paper tape (Wheatstone slip) and converted the dot pattern into mark and space symbols on the telegraph line. It worked by two rods alternately rising up to sample the holes in the tape. First of all the top hole was probed, and if the rod could go through, it moved a compound lever that connected the mark signal to the line. With no hole the lever remained unmoved. Next the top hole rod dropped and the bottom hole rod checked whether there was a bottom hole in the tape. If there was, the compound lever was moved back to connect the space signal on the line. If there was no hole, the compound lever was left alone as it was. An extra switch enabled the transmitter to be bypassed so that a Morse key could be used instead.

The Wheatstone receiver converted the signal on the telegraph line to an inked pattern on a paper strip. An electromagnet electrically connected to the telegraph line moved an inking wheel to press against the paper. A clockwork mechanism advanced the paper tape, and turned the inking wheel, and an ink supply wheel. The paper advance speed could be adjusted between 7 and 60 feet per minute. Power to the clockwork had three sources: it could be a coiled spring, a weight, or an electric motor. Paper spools were stored in drawers beneath the reader to allow quick change when one was exhausted. The ink supply wheel turned in an inkwell. The machine was started and stopped by use of a lever. In electrical characteristics, the electromagnet had two windings, each of 100 ohms resistance. These could be connected in parallel or series to achieve a 50 or 200 ohm resistance, to better match the telegraph line. Other maintenance that might have been required was cleaning of the marker and supply wheels, adjusting the armature-coil spacing to avoid a marking or spacing bias, and cleaning the sounding tongue and contact points.

The Wheatstone telegram consisted of strips of paper tape with the Morse code printed on it, pasted on a form. The telegram would later be retyped to make a final presentable message for the recipient.

== Alphabet, numbers and symbols ==
A ⠇⠳⠂ B ⠳⠇⠇⠇⠂ C ⠳⠇⠳⠇⠂ D ⠳⠇⠇⠂ E ⠇⠂ F ⠇⠇⠳⠇⠂ G ⠳⠳⠇⠂ H ⠇⠇⠇⠇⠂ I ⠇⠇⠂ J ⠇⠳⠳⠳⠂ K ⠳⠇⠳⠂ L ⠇⠳⠇⠇⠂ M ⠳⠳⠂ N ⠳⠇⠂ O ⠳⠳⠳⠂ P ⠇⠳⠳⠇⠂ Q ⠳⠳⠇⠳⠂ R ⠇⠳⠇⠂ S ⠇⠇⠇⠂ T ⠳⠂ U ⠇⠇⠳⠂ V ⠇⠇⠇⠳⠂ W ⠇⠳⠳⠂ X ⠳⠇⠇⠳⠂ Y ⠳⠇⠳⠳⠂ Z ⠳⠳⠇⠇⠂
1 ⠇⠳⠳⠳⠳⠂ 2 ⠇⠇⠳⠳⠳⠂ 3 ⠇⠇⠇⠳⠳⠂ 4 ⠇⠇⠇⠇⠳⠂ 5 ⠇⠇⠇⠇⠇⠂ 6 ⠳⠇⠇⠇⠇⠂ 7 ⠳⠳⠇⠇⠇⠂ 8 ⠳⠳⠳⠇⠇⠂ 9 ⠳⠳⠳⠳⠇⠂ 0 ⠳⠳⠳⠳⠳⠂ \ ⠇⠳⠇⠇⠳⠂ / ⠳⠇⠇⠳⠇⠂ ? ⠇⠇⠳⠳⠇⠇⠂ = ⠳⠇⠇⠇⠳⠂
