= Wolfram =

Wolfram may refer to:

== Arts and entertainment ==
- Wolfram (film), a 2025 Australian film by Warwick Thornton
- Wolfram (musician), an Austrian DJ
- The Wolfram, a fictional military airship in the air combat video game The Sky Crawlers: Innocent Aces

== Science and technology ==
- Wolfram (element), the original name for the chemical element best known as tungsten
- Wolfram Research, a software company known for the symbolic computation program Mathematica
  - Wolfram Language, the programming language used by Mathematica
  - Wolfram code, a naming system for one-dimensional cellular automaton rules introduced by Stephen Wolfram
- Wolfram syndrome, a genetic disorder

== Other uses ==
- Wolfram (name), a Germanic masculine given name and a surname (includes a list of people with the name)
- Wolfram, Queensland, a former mining town in Australia
