= Council of European Municipalities and Regions =

Association of local and regional governments

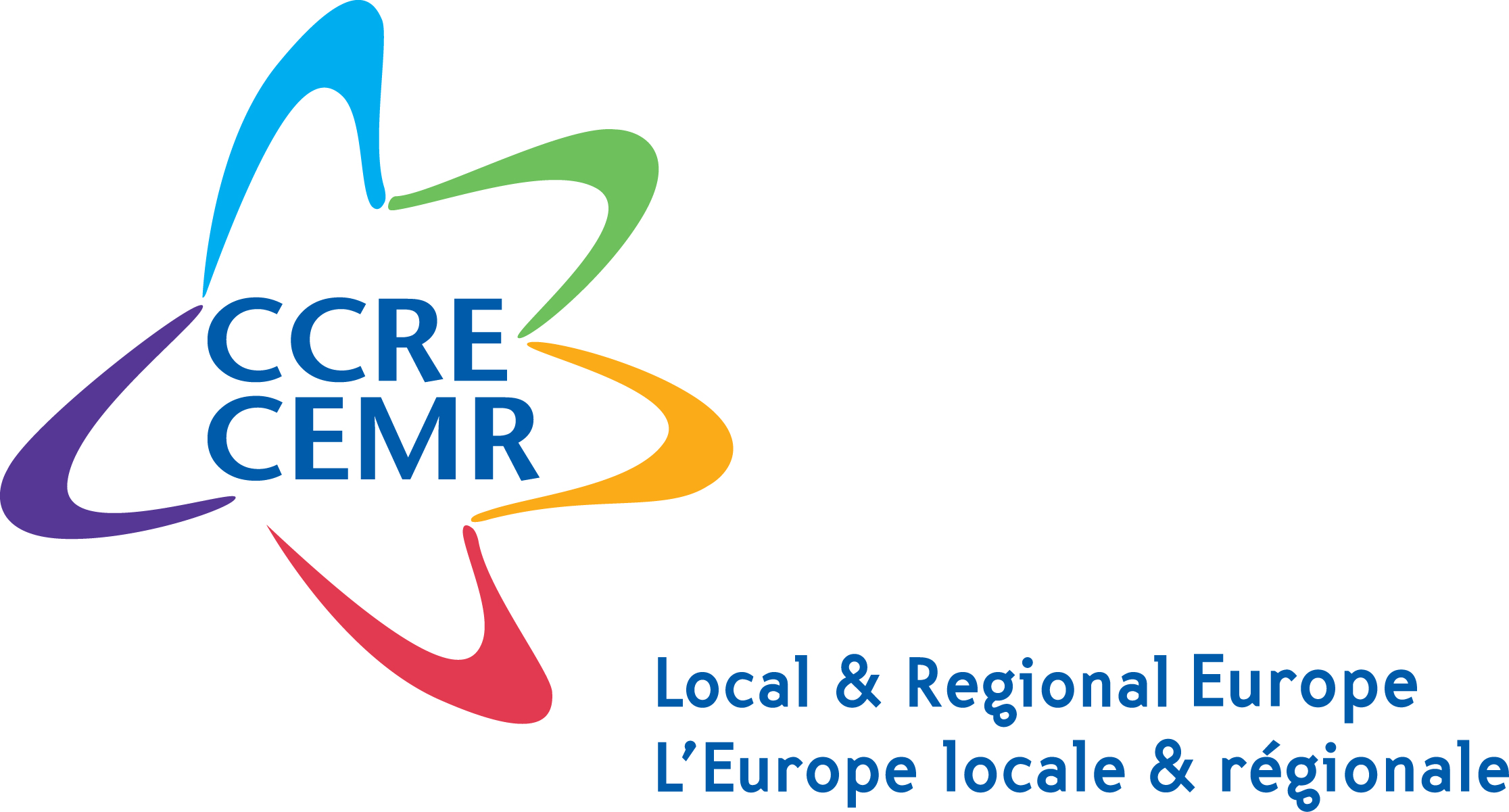
- CEMR logo
- Formation: 1951
- Type: Association
- Location(s): Square de Meeûs, 1 B-1000 Brussels, Belgium
- Members: 130,000
- President: Gunn Marit Helgesen
- Secretary General: Fabrizio Rossi
- Staff: 30
- Website: www.ccre.org

The Council of European Municipalities and Regions (CEMR) is the largest organisation of local and regional governments in Europe. Its members are 60 national associations of towns, municipalities and regions from 41 countries that are part of the Council of Europe. Together these associations represent about 130,000 local and regional authorities.

At the head of its political structure is its president, currently the councillor of Vestfold and Telemark, Norway and president of the Norwegian Association of Local and Regional Authorities, Gunn Marit Helgesen. It has a staff of about 30, headed by its secretary-general, Fabrizio Rossi.

CEMR’s annual budget is about €2.5 million. Membership fees from its national associations make up the bulk of its funding. About 15% are paid by the European Commission through an annual grant.

The organisation has also assumed the function of the European section of the new worldwide organisation United Cities and Local Governments.

== History ==
CEMR logo (1970's–2012)

CEMR was founded in Geneva on 28 January 1951 by a group of European mayors as Council of European Municipalities (CEM). Regions were later allowed to join as well, hence the later name Council of European Municipalities and Regions.

=== CEMR Presidency ===
Gunn Marit Helgesen, chair of the Norwegian Association of Local and Regional Authorities (KS) and councillor of Vestfold og Telemark, was elected President of CEMR in December 2022.

She is notably succeeding:

- Stefano Bonaccini, President of Emilia-Romagna, CEMR President from 2016 to 2022
- Íñigo de la Serna, Mayor of Santander, CEMR President from 2015 to 2016
- Annemarie Jorritsma, Mayor of Almere, CEMR President from 2013 to 2015
- Wolfgang Schuster, Mayor of Stuttgart, CEMR President from 2010 to 2013
- Michael Häupl, Mayor of Vienna, CEMR President from 2004 to 2010.
- Valéry Giscard d'Estaing, President of the Regional Council of Auvergne and former President of France, CEMR president from 1997 to 2004

== Activities ==
CEMR's task is to promote a united Europe, based on locally and regionally autonomous government and democracy. To this end, it endeavours to shape the future of Europe by enhancing local and regional contributions, to influence European law and policy, to exchange experience at the local and regional levels and to cooperate with partners in other parts of the world. European legislation affects more than 60% of the policies implemented by cities, municipalities and regions. CEMR works together with its members to ensure that their interests are taken into account when European policy is being drafted.

CEMR is active in a number of political fields, including regional policy, transport, the environment, equal opportunities and governance. Its committees and working groups seek to influence draft EU legislation in order that the interests and concerns of local and regional authorities are taken into account from the earliest stages of the EU legislative process.

=== Fields of activity ===
CEMR’s work focuses on five thematic areas, which affect all aspects of the lives of European citizens as well as the local and regional authorities that represent them:

- Governance, democracy and citizenship
- Environment, climate and energy
- International engagement and cooperation
- Local and regional public services
- Economic, social and territorial cohesion

CEMR is also deeply involved in building an extensive European town twinning network. Today, there are over 30,000 twinning projects linking towns from all over Europe. This process is improved through CEMR's close cooperation with the DG Education and Culture of the European Commission.

Last but not least, CEMR is behind several political documents of significance to local and regional governance, such as the Charter of Local Liberties (adopted in 1953), which inspired the Charter on Local Self-Government of the Council of Europe, adopted in 1985. It also launched the European Charter for Equality of Women and Men in Local Life, which was adopted in 2006 and has been signed by more than 1,800 local and regional governments in Europe.

== Social dialogue ==
CEMR represents European local and regional governments (LRG) as employers in the EU social dialogue committee of LRGs, where it sits and discusses with EPSU, the sectorial trade union.

The committee was formally established in 2004 and covers the local and regional public services, such as local administrators, fire-fighters, waste workers, community liaison personnel, etc., counting for some 13 million workers in the EU and 100 000 local and regional authorities.

The committee is a forum for promoting quality public service, exchanging information on labour market issues, and influencing legislation and policy in the fields of employment, training, social protection, labour law, and health and safety.

== Gender equality ==
In May 2006 CEMR launched the European charter for equality of women and men in local life. Local and regional governments are invited to sign the charter to make a formal public commitment to the principle of equality between men and women and to implement the charter within their territory.

The Charter is now available in 27 languages and is signed by more than 1,800 municipalities and regions from 36 European countries.

In order to monitor the implementation of the Charter by signatories, CEMR, in partnership with the Swedish government and the Swedish Association of Local Authorities and Regions, launched an Observatory of the European Charter for equality of women and men in Local Life in March 2012.

== Town twinning ==
According to CEMR town twinning has always been a vital way to bring Europe closer to its citizens beyond national boundaries.

In May 2007, CEMR organised a conference on Twinning for tomorrow's world in Rhodes. Over 600 representatives of local governments from across Europe met to discuss issues like new types of twinning; obtaining financial support; and how twinning can contribute to social inclusion. In September 2011, CEMR is organising in Rybnik (Poland) a European congress on citizenship and twinning. It will provide participants with the possibility to discover the next generation of partnerships between local and regional governments and their citizens; explore how to foster the development of a more "grassroots democracy" and to participate in a consultation on citizenship.

== See also ==
- Congress of the Council of Europe
- European Union Regional policy
- List of micro-regional organizations
