= Siljan =

Siljan may refer to:

== People ==
- Siljan Avramovski, a Macedonian police official and former Minister of Internal Affairs

== Places ==
=== Norway ===
- Siljan Municipality, a municipality in Telemark county, Norway
- Siljan (village), a village in Siljan Municipality in Telemark county, Norway
- Siljan Church, a church in Siljan Municipality in Telemark county, Norway
- Siljan prestegjeld, a former geographic subdivision of the Church of Norway in Telemark county, Norway

=== Sweden ===
- Siljan (lake), a lake in Dalarna, Sweden
- Siljan Ring, a prehistoric impact crater in Dalarna, central Sweden
