= Telemark County Municipality =

Telemark County Municipality Telemark fylkeskommune
- County municipality
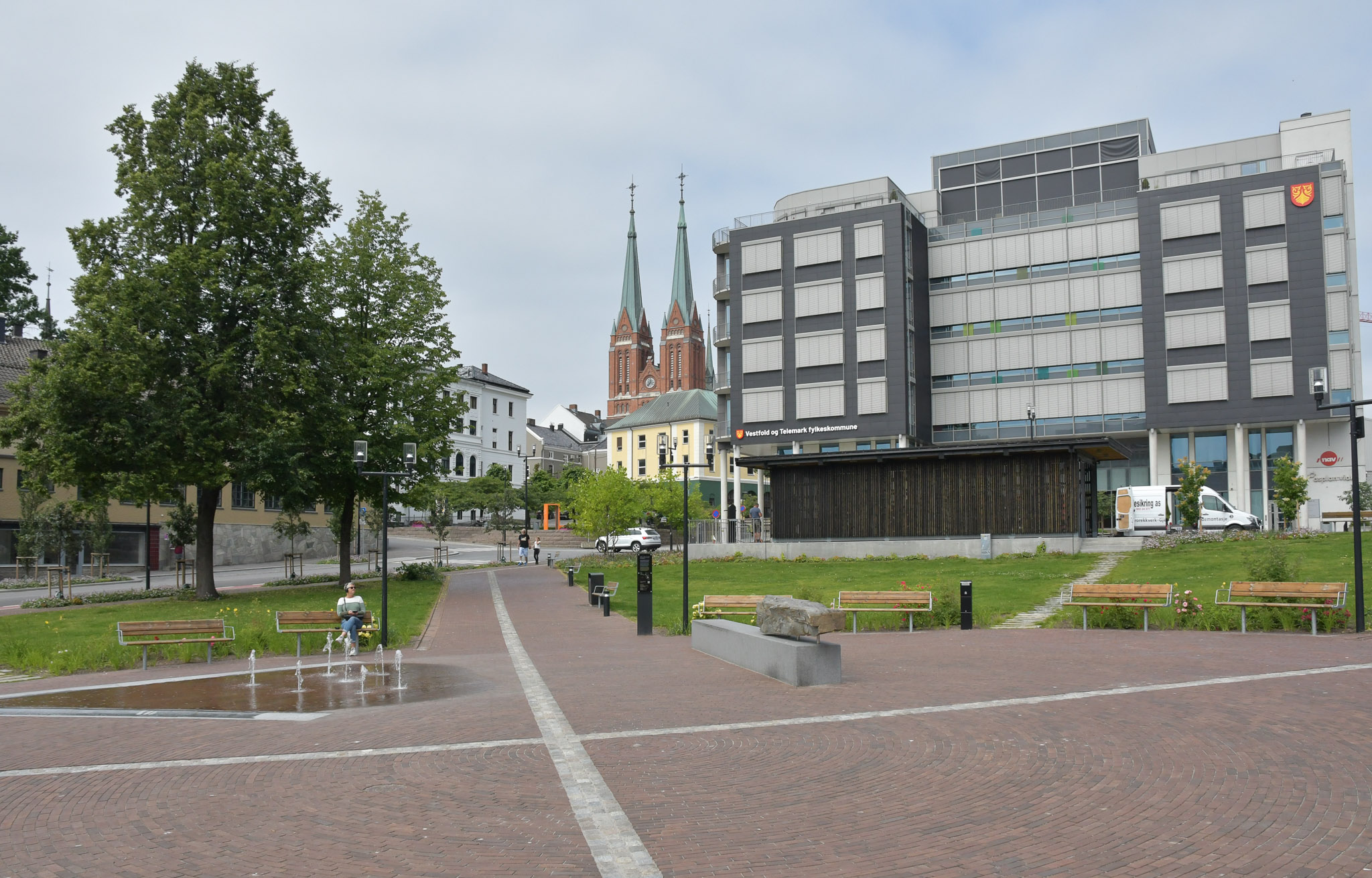
- Administrative office of the county municipality in Skien

- Coat of arms

- Location in Norway
- Coordinates: 59°12′58″N 9°36′44″E
- Country: Norway
- Established: 1662
- Dissolved: 1 January 2020
- Re-established: 1 January 2024
- Administrative center: Skien

Government
  - County mayor: Sven Tore Løksild
- ISO 3166 code: NO-08
- Revenue: NOK 1,508
- Employees: 1,544
- Schools: 13
- Transit authority: Farte
- Website: www.telemarkfylke.no

Telemark County Municipality (Norwegian: Telemark fylkeskommune) is the regional governing administration of Telemark county in Norway. The county municipality was established in its current form on 1 January 1976 when the law was changed to allow elected county councils in Norway. The county municipality was dissolved on 1 January 2020, when Telemark was merged with the neighboring Vestfold county, creating the new Vestfold og Telemark county which is led by the Vestfold og Telemark County Municipality. In 2024, the merger was undone and Telemark county was re-established. The administration is located in Skien. The county municipality has around 1,544 employees, and in 2007, a revenue of 1,508 million kr.

== County government ==
The county municipality's most important tasks include secondary education, recreation (sports and outdoor life), and cultural heritage. The county municipality is also responsible for all county roads (including ferry operations) and public transport (including school busses). The county municipality has further responsibility for regional land-use planning, business development, power production, and environmental management. The county also has responsibility for providing dental health services (in 2002, responsibility for hospitals and public medicine was transferred from the counties to the new regional health authorities).

=== County mayor ===
Since 1963, the county mayor (Norwegian: fylkesordfører) of Telemark has been the political leader of the county and the chairperson of the county council. Prior to 1963, the County governor led the council which was made up of all of the mayors of the rural municipalities within the county. Here is a list of people who have held this position:

- 1964–1967: Arne Midgaard (Ap)
- 1968–1971: Oddvar Berrefjord (Ap)
- 1971–1971: Sigurd Kolltveit (Ap)
- 1972–1979: Henry Finrud (Ap)
- 1980–1983: Bjørn Øvrum Nielsen (H)
- 1984–1991: Per Svardal (Ap)
- 1992–1995: Frode Ronald Svendsen (Ap)
- 1995–2003: Andreas Kjær (Sp)
- 2003–2011: Gunn Marit Helgesen (H)
- 2011–2015: Terje Riis-Johansen (Sp)
- 2015–2019: Sven Tore Løkslid (Ap)
- (2020–2024: Part of Vestfold og Telemark County Municipality)
- 2024–2026: Sven Tore Løksild (Ap)
- 2026–present: Terje Riis-Johansen (Sp)

=== County council ===
The county council (Norwegian: Fylkestinget) is made up of 41 representatives that are elected by direct election by all legal residents of the county every fourth year. The council is the legislative body for the county. The county council typically meets about six times a year. Council members are divided into standing committees and an executive committee (fylkesutvalg), which meet considerably more often. Both the council and executive committee (with at least 5 members) are led by the county mayor (Norwegian: fylkesordfører). The executive committee carries out the executive functions of the county under the direction of the whole council. The tables below show the current and historical composition of the council by political party.

Telemark fylkesting 2024–2027
Party name (in Norwegian)	Number of representatives
Labour Party (Arbeiderpartiet)	12
Progress Party (Fremskrittspartiet)	6
Green Party (Miljøpartiet De Grønne)	1
Conservative Party (Høyre)	8
Industry and Business Party (Industri‑ og Næringspartiet)	2
Christian Democratic Party (Kristelig Folkeparti)	1
Red Party (Rødt)	2
Centre Party (Senterpartiet)	4
Socialist Left Party (Sosialistisk Venstreparti)	3
Liberal Party (Venstre)	1
Independent (Uavhengig)	2
Total number of members:	41

Telemark fylkesting 2015–2019
Party name (in Norwegian)	Number of representatives
Labour Party (Arbeiderpartiet)	16
Progress Party (Fremskrittspartiet)	5
Green Party (Miljøpartiet De Grønne)	2
Conservative Party (Høyre)	7
Christian Democratic Party (Kristelig Folkeparti)	3
Red Party (Rødt)	1
Centre Party (Senterpartiet)	5
Socialist Left Party (Sosialistisk Venstreparti)	1
Liberal Party (Venstre)	1
Total number of members:	41

Telemark fylkesting 2011–2015
Party name (in Norwegian)	Number of representatives
Labour Party (Arbeiderpartiet)	16
Progress Party (Fremskrittspartiet)	5
Conservative Party (Høyre)	10
Christian Democratic Party (Kristelig Folkeparti)	3
Centre Party (Senterpartiet)	3
Socialist Left Party (Sosialistisk Venstreparti)	2
Liberal Party (Venstre)	2
Total number of members:	41

Telemark fylkesting 2007–2011
Party name (in Norwegian)	Number of representatives
Labour Party (Arbeiderpartiet)	15
Progress Party (Fremskrittspartiet)	9
Conservative Party (Høyre)	5
Christian Democratic Party (Kristelig Folkeparti)	3
Red Party (Rødt)	1
Centre Party (Senterpartiet)	3
Socialist Left Party (Sosialistisk Venstreparti)	3
Liberal Party (Venstre)	2
Total number of members:	41

Telemark fylkesting 2003–2007
Party name (in Norwegian)	Number of representatives
Labour Party (Arbeiderpartiet)	14
Progress Party (Fremskrittspartiet)	9
Conservative Party (Høyre)	4
Christian Democratic Party (Kristelig Folkeparti)	3
Centre Party (Senterpartiet)	4
Socialist Left Party (Sosialistisk Venstreparti)	6
Liberal Party (Venstre)	1
Total number of members:	41

Telemark fylkesting 1999–2003
Party name (in Norwegian)	Number of representatives
Labour Party (Arbeiderpartiet)	19
Progress Party (Fremskrittspartiet)	8
Conservative Party (Høyre)	8
Christian Democratic Party (Kristelig Folkeparti)	7
Red Electoral Alliance (Rød Valgallianse)	1
Centre Party (Senterpartiet)	5
Socialist Left Party (Sosialistisk Venstreparti)	5
Liberal Party (Venstre)	2
Total number of members:	55

Telemark fylkesting 1995–1999
Party name (in Norwegian)	Number of representatives
Labour Party (Arbeiderpartiet)	19
Progress Party (Fremskrittspartiet)	7
Conservative Party (Høyre)	7
Christian Democratic Party (Kristelig Folkeparti)	5
Pensioners' Party (Pensjonistpartiet)	2
Red Electoral Alliance (Rød Valgallianse)	1
Centre Party (Senterpartiet)	7
Socialist Left Party (Sosialistisk Venstreparti)	4
Liberal Party (Venstre)	3
Total number of members:	55

Telemark fylkesting 1991–1995
Party name (in Norwegian)	Number of representatives
Labour Party (Arbeiderpartiet)	18
Progress Party (Fremskrittspartiet)	4
Conservative Party (Høyre)	9
Christian Democratic Party (Kristelig Folkeparti)	5
Red Electoral Alliance (Rød Valgallianse)	1
Centre Party (Senterpartiet)	7
Socialist Left Party (Sosialistisk Venstreparti)	9
Liberal Party (Venstre)	2
Total number of members:	55

Telemark fylkesting 1987–1991
Party name (in Norwegian)	Number of representatives
Labour Party (Arbeiderpartiet)	24
Progress Party (Fremskrittspartiet)	5
Conservative Party (Høyre)	11
Christian Democratic Party (Kristelig Folkeparti)	5
Centre Party (Senterpartiet)	3
Socialist Left Party (Sosialistisk Venstreparti)	4
Liberal Party (Venstre)	3
Total number of members:	55

Telemark fylkesting 1983–1987
Party name (in Norwegian)	Number of representatives
Labour Party (Arbeiderpartiet)	27
Progress Party (Fremskrittspartiet)	2
Conservative Party (Høyre)	12
Christian Democratic Party (Kristelig Folkeparti)	6
Centre Party (Senterpartiet)	3
Socialist Left Party (Sosialistisk Venstreparti)	3
Liberal Party (Venstre)	2
Total number of members:	55

Telemark fylkesting 1979–1983
Party name (in Norwegian)	Number of representatives
Labour Party (Arbeiderpartiet)	24
Progress Party (Fremskrittspartiet)	1
Conservative Party (Høyre)	12
Christian Democratic Party (Kristelig Folkeparti)	7
New People's Party (Nye Folkepartiet)	1
Centre Party (Senterpartiet)	4
Socialist Left Party (Sosialistisk Venstreparti)	3
Liberal Party (Venstre)	3
Total number of members:	55

Telemark fylkesting 1976–1979
Party name (in Norwegian)	Number of representatives
Labour Party (Arbeiderpartiet)	24
Anders Lange's Party (Anders Langes parti)	1
Conservative Party (Høyre)	7
Christian Democratic Party (Kristelig Folkeparti)	9
New People's Party (Nye Folkepartiet)	2
Centre Party (Senterpartiet)	5
Socialist Left Party (Sosialistisk Venstreparti)	4
Liberal Party (Venstre)	3
Total number of members:	55

== Upper Secondary Schools ==
The county government runs these schools:

- Bamble Upper Secondary School
- Bø vidaregåande skule
- Croftholmen Upper Secondary School
- Hjalmar Johansen Upper Secondary School
- Kragerø Upper Secondary School
- Lunde vidaregåande skule
- Notodden Upper Secondary School
- Porsgrunn Upper Secondary School
- Rjukan Upper Secondary School
- Skien Upper Secondary School
- Skogmo Upper Secondary School
- Søve Upper Secondary School
- Vest-Telemark Upper Secondary School
