= Levelling-up policy of the Conservative government =

UK government policy under Boris Johnson and Rishi Sunak

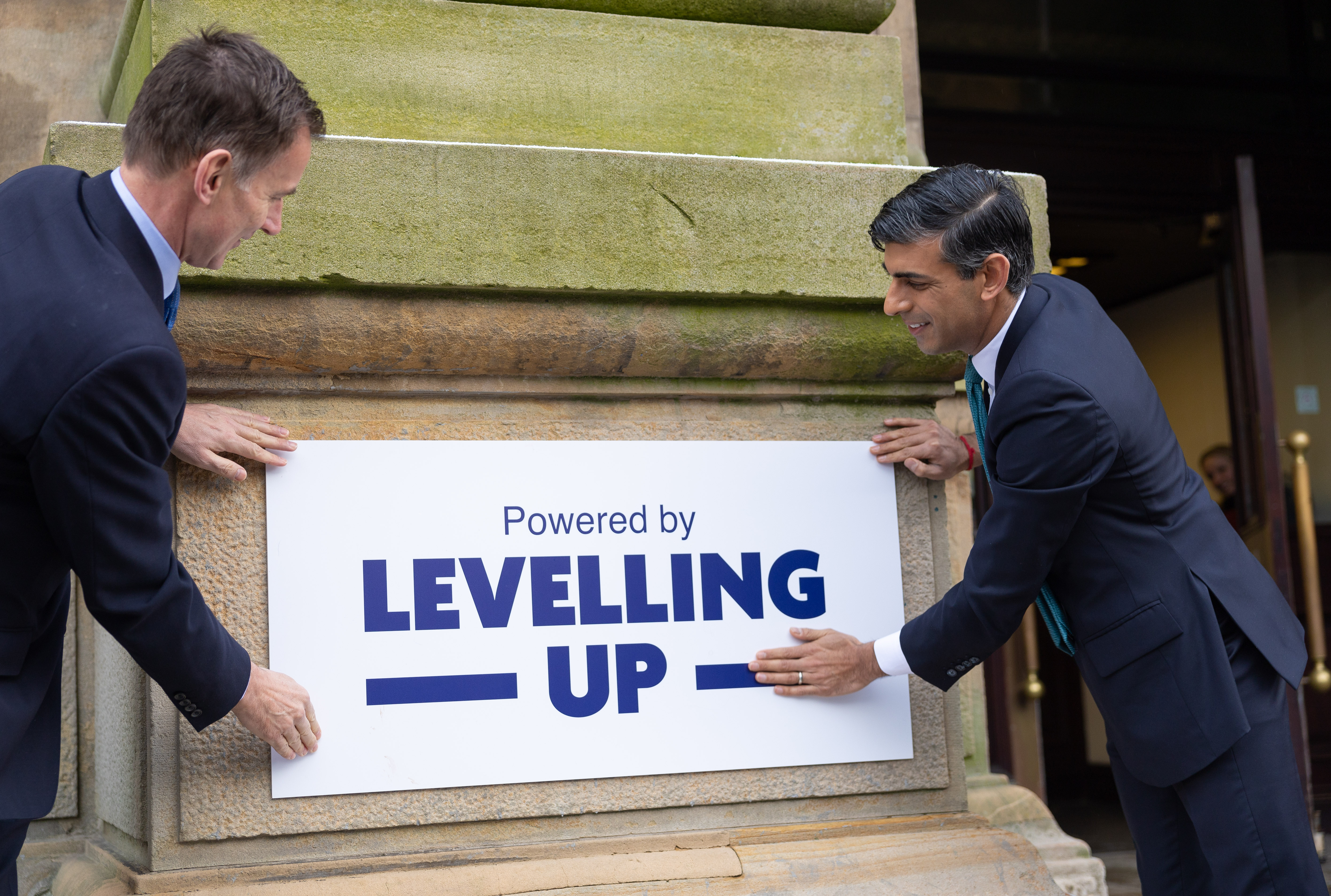
Chancellor of the Exchequer Jeremy Hunt (left) and Prime Minister Rishi Sunak (right) in January 2023, promoting the government's "Levelling up policies", on a visit to Accrington Market

"Levelling up" was a political policy first articulated in the 2019 Conservative Party manifesto that aimed to reduce the imbalances, primarily economic, between areas and social groups across the United Kingdom. It sought to do so without acting to the detriment of prosperous areas, such as much of South East England. A white paper for the policy was published by Boris Johnson's government on 2 February 2022, and was continued by Rishi Sunak's government. The policy was overseen by the Department for Levelling Up, Housing and Communities.

The concept of levelling up has bipartisan support. Keir Starmer, the Labour Party leader, said in October 2022 that a future Labour government would "pick up the challenge of levelling up", but that his party believed only they would be able to deliver it, calling Johnson's plan to deliver levelling up "an empty slogan".

After the Labour Party won the 2024 general election, the phrase was replaced with "local government" in department names and ministerial titles, with "Pride In Place" initiatives replacing previous levelling up programmes from February 2026.

== History ==
=== Origins ===
The term "levelling-up" was first used in the House of Commons in 1868 in relation to equality between Catholicism and the Church of England, with Charles Robert Barry, the Solicitor General for Ireland, saying "If religious equality were attempted in England, it must be either by levelling up or levelling down." Conservative Prime Minister Benjamin Disraeli responded by noting the phrase to be one which "seems to be a very favourite one with Hon. Gentlemen opposite" and said that he should "very much like to have their views as to the distinct meaning they attribute to the phrase".

In his diaries, published in 1993, Tory Minister Alan Clark quoted colleague Michael Jopling's remark that "...the trouble with Michael (Heseltine) is that he had to buy his own furniture and he occasionally whines about the Servant Problem. It's because of death duties and the 'levelling up' of standards of the lower classes. Why, poor Jane had to drain and clean the swimming pool herself." The phrase was also used in the 2004 BBC dramatisation of Clark's diaries.

As a newly elected MP, future Prime Minister Theresa May used the term during an education debate in the House of Commons in 1997. She described socialism as "levelling down" and conservatism as "levelling up".

At the 2003 Labour Party Conference, Labour Party leader and the then Prime Minister Tony Blair stated: "I don't want to level down, I want to level up", when discussing his preference for low taxes in support of upwardly social mobility.

Former Conservative MP for Putney Justine Greening said in 2021 that she invented the term "levelling up" in 2014, while attempting to explain the concept of social mobility to her mother. In her acceptance speech after securing her seat in the 2015 general election, Greening pledged to focus "on making sure we have a levelled up Britain where everyone can achieve their potential wherever they start, wherever they're born". Greening first used the term "levelling up" as a policy in 2015, while delivering a speech as Secretary of State for International Development at the 2015 Conservative Party Conference in an attempt to "encourage the then party leadership to focus on domestic social mobility". During her tenure as Education Secretary, the phrase "levelling up" appeared increasingly frequently in Department for Education papers, as well as Greening's own speeches and op-eds. However, outside of the Department for Education, the phrase did not receive more widespread use during the Cameron or May premierships.

Greening claims to have spoken to all candidates in the 2019 Conservative Party leadership election about the importance of levelling up, but that only Johnson appeared to show any enthusiasm for it.

The first use of "levelling up" as an official Conservative Party policy was in the party's manifesto for the 2019 general election, which stated that a Johnson government "will use this investment prudently and strategically to level up every part of the United Kingdom, while strengthening the ties that bind it together."

=== Launch ===
Prime Minister Boris Johnson gave a speech on the policy on 15 July 2021, where he described the various inequalities currently experienced across the United Kingdom. He contrasted "levelling up" with "levelling down" by saying that levelling up would seek to improve everywhere, rather than the zero sum averaging regional policies of the past, stating "we don't think you can make the poor parts of the country richer by making the rich parts poorer". Johnson also included social and quality of life issues such as fighting gang crime, obesity, mental health, uneven life-expectancy and excessive elective surgery waiting times within the wider levelling up agenda.

MP Neil O'Brien was the Prime Minister's levelling up adviser, producing a detailed report in September 2020 setting out the case for levelling up.

The 2020 Treasury spending review announced a £4.8 billion Levelling Up Fund for interim capital investment in local infrastructure. Local authorities were ranked into three tiers by need, and invited to submit project bids by June 2021. The first round focused on transport projects, town centre and high street regeneration, and cultural investment. Two other funds are considered within the interim levelling up agenda: the Community Renewal Fund, which replaces the European Structural and Investment Funds for skills, employment, local businesses, and communities, and the £3.6 billion Towns Fund for 101 towns.

The 2021 Queen's Speech announced that the Government will "level up opportunities across all parts of the United Kingdom, supporting jobs, businesses and economic growth and addressing the impact of the pandemic on public services".

The policy was first trailed to include:

- Investment in towns, cities, and rural and coastal areas through use of local growth deals;
- Giving those areas more control of how investment is made;
- Levelling up skills using apprenticeships and a £3 billion National Skills Fund;
- Helping the farming and fishing industries; and
- Creating up to 10 freeports to help deprived communities.

=== Implementation ===
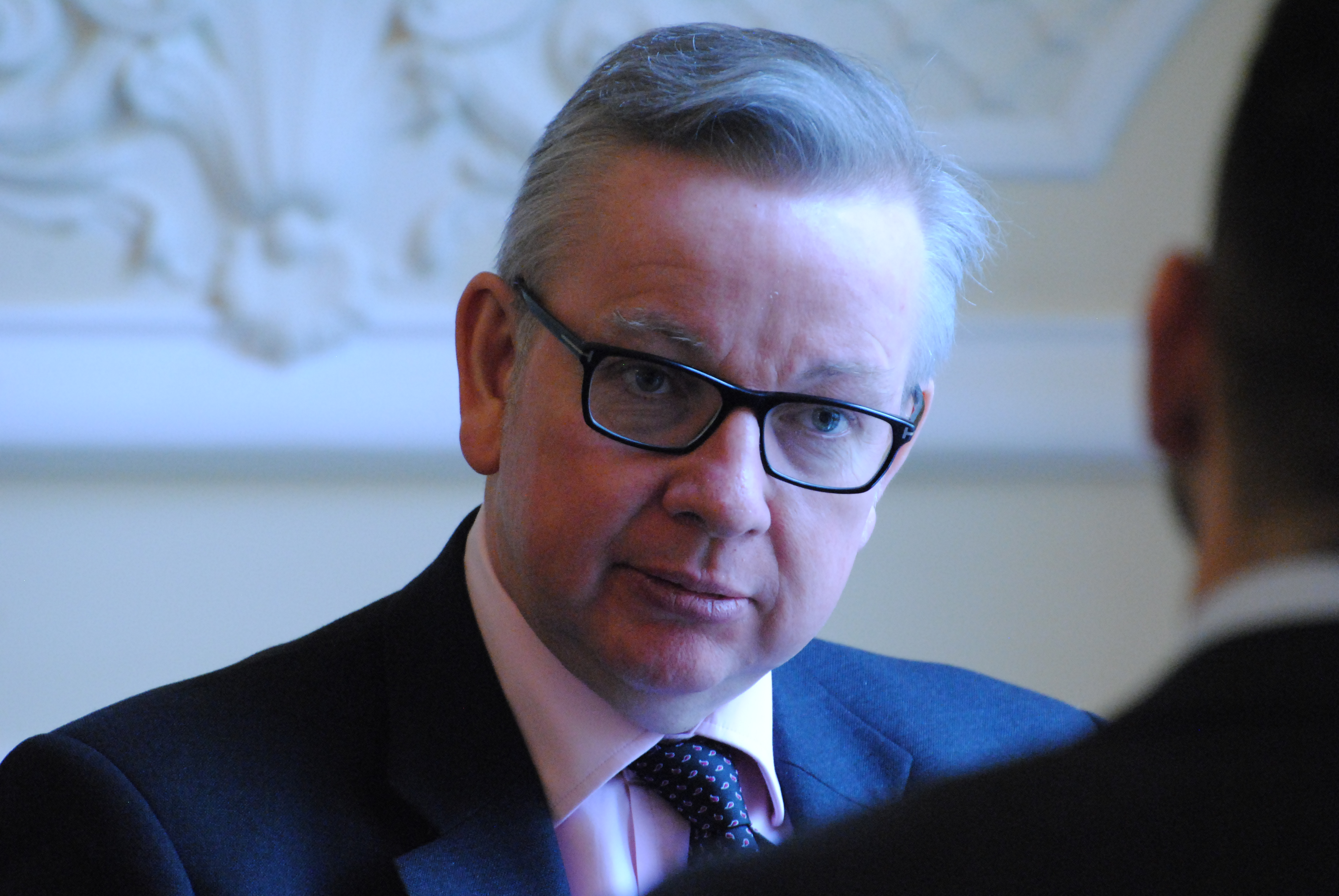
Michael Gove, the former Secretary of State for Levelling Up, Housing and Communities.

In September 2021 the Ministry for Housing, Communities and Local Government was renamed the Department for Levelling Up, Housing and Communities under Secretary of State Michael Gove. Neil O'Brien became a Parliamentary Under-Secretary of State for the department. Former Bank of England Chief Economist Andy Haldane was appointed as the head of the Levelling Up Taskforce, operating in the Cabinet Office in conjunction with 15 civil servants from various departments.

In his October 2021 Conservative Party Conference speech, Prime Minister Boris Johnson again emphasised the policy, saying "uniting and levelling up across the UK [is] the greatest project that any government can embark on." Across government, Levelling Up is viewed as a major policy area with funding, and departments framed policies in their remit to the levelling up agenda for the October 2021 United Kingdom budget which incorporated the 2021 Treasury spending review. A Levelling Up white paper was expected by the end of 2021, but was delayed until January 2022.

The successful bids for the first £1.7 billion tranche of the Levelling Up Fund were announced with the budget. The three largest grants were £49.6 million for the south Derby growth zone and infinity garden village, £48 million to help replace vessels and improve harbours Isles of Scilly residents rely on, and £38.7 million for the Advanced Manufacturing Innovation District Scotland travel improvement project in Renfrewshire. On 30 January 2022, Wolverhampton and Sheffield were chosen as the first places to receive levelling up funding.

In the 2021/2022 financial year only £107 million of levelling up funds were delivered to projects, compared to the original £600 million ambition, later reduced to £200 million in plans.

In summer 2022, the parliamentary Levelling Up, Housing and Communities Committee was asked to comment on the Levelling-up and Regeneration Bill, on which it held three evidence sessions. Its main comment was that the bill provided no funding toward the levelling-up missions of public transport and local connectivity, digital connectivity, improving education outcomes, adult skills training and increasing healthy life expectancy. It stated there was a lack of detail in the bill. The committee was concerned that the bill potentially added to centralising planning decisions, rather than supporting localism. It was concerned that affordable housing was not well supported in the 300,000 new homes per year target, and there were no tenure type and location targets.

In April 2024, Secretary of State for Levelling Up, Housing and Communities Michael Gove stated that 2030 should be the reference point by which the implementation of the policy should be judged, comparing it to a half-built cathedral by stating "well some of it looks great but the rest of it is just a mess".

==== Continuation of Levelling Up post-Johnson ====
With the policy of Levelling Up so closely associated with the Johnson Premiership, many were concerned over the policy's future following his departure. Indeed, the series of mass Ministerial resignations in July 2022 which led to Johnson's resignation, and the subsequent firing of Michael Gove, meant that Eddie Hughes, Parliamentary Under-Secretary of State for Rough Sleeping and Housing, was left as the sole serving Minister within the Department for Levelling Up, Housing and Communities.

Following the election of Liz Truss as Prime Minister in September 2022, there was uncertainty around her position on Levelling Up, and the future of the policy under her Premiership. While Centre for Cities argued that the policy of Levelling Up would prove a useful mechanism for Truss' economic growth agenda, UK in a Changing Europe noted that this did not align with her commitments to reducing government investment, or proposals around regional pay for public servants. Ultimately, Truss resigned from the Premiership after 49 days, before she was able to make any significant policy announcements regarding Levelling Up.

After replacing Truss as Prime Minister in October 2022, Rishi Sunak remained more committed to Levelling Up, delivering the planned second phase of the Levelling-Up Fund totalling £2.1bn, and reallocating funding from the cancellation of HS2 to projects aimed at levelling up local transport networks. However research by the Institute for Government found that, while there had been some "promising steps" on the progression of Levelling Up, the policy had generally "lost momentum" under Sunak's leadership.

During their General Election 2024 campaign the Conservative Party pledged to give an addition £20m of Levelling Up funding to 30 towns across the country, with local people in each area deciding how the money would be spent, through new town boards composed of community leaders, businesspeople, local government and the local MP.

== White paper ==
The delayed white paper, originally expected in 2021, was published on 2 February 2022. The Department for Levelling Up, Housing and Communities described the white paper as a "moral, social and economic programme for the whole of government. The Levelling Up White Paper sets out how we will spread opportunity more equally across the UK".

There are sections making provisions for affordable housing. Areas with weak education performance will be targeted for extra investment.

=== Missions ===
The White Paper lists 12 missions, aimed to be achieved by 2030:

- Increase pay, employment and productivity
- Domestic public investment in R&D outside south-east to rise by at least 40%.
- London-style public transport connectivity across the UK
- Nationwide broadband
- Fixing the education gap
- Skills training
- Narrowing life expectancy gap, with a UK-wide rise of five years by 2035
- Rise in wellbeing
- Decreased inequalities
- Rise in overall number of first-time homebuyers
- Crime reduction
- Devolution in England

=== Devolution ===
Areas of England that will have the choice of devolution include Cornwall, Derbyshire & Derby; Devon, Plymouth and Torbay; Durham; Hull & East Yorkshire; Leicestershire; Norfolk; Nottinghamshire & Nottingham; and Suffolk.

An "Islands Forum" will be established to enable local authorities and Islanders in Orkney, Shetland, the Western Isles, Anglesey and the Isle of Wight to work together on common issues, such as broadband connectivity, and to allow them to communicate directly with the government on the challenges island communities face in terms of levelling up.

The Welsh Government will be consulted on levelling up in Wales.

A £2.6 billion UK Shared Prosperity Fund will be decentralised to local leaders.

== Reception ==
=== Criticism ===
Following the initial announcement of the policy in 2020, a number of think-tanks, charities and politicians criticised the levelling up funds for being insufficient and centrally managed, rather than being controlled by regions.

In March 2021, the Industrial Strategy Council, a government watchdog chaired by Andy Haldane, who later became the head of the Levelling Up Taskforce, said the plans were "thinly spread", overly focused on infrastructure spending directed by central government, and lacking detail. It also said the scheme's lack of success criteria would make it hard to determine its impact.

The Financial Times reported that the methodology used by the levelling up scheme to determine which areas would receive funds ignored most standard indicators of poverty, and classified 14 areas with higher-than-average wealth levels as "priority one" regions, ahead of more deprived areas. The report noted that all 14 areas had Conservative Party MPs, and its analysis found that Conservative-voting areas were consistently prioritised over poorer Labour-voting areas. A number of critics accused the government of "pork barrel politics".

Levelling Up Fund spending has been criticised for doubts that small local projects could transform the economy or create long-term jobs, and for not giving devolved governments in Scotland, Wales and Northern Ireland a role in selecting projects. An analysis by The Guardian determined that Conservative Party-run local authorities received a higher per capita grant (£93) from the first tranche of the fund than Labour Party-run local authorities (£65 per capita), with no overall control areas receiving £102 per capita and Liberal Democrat areas £183 per capita. A government spokesperson disputed the analysis, saying the criteria for funding was publicly published.

The Institute for Public Policy Research North think tank estimated that levelling funds will lose £560m due to Jeremy Hunt not inflation-proofing the funds. The IPPR wrote "With £1 in every £13 of the LUF and SPF now expected to be lost to inflation, cancelling, scaling back or pausing infrastructure investment is inevitable without additional support. (...) But reducing the scope of levelling up projects will have implications for the impact they deliver, both in terms of any contribution they may have made to local economic growth and the success of the missions outlined in the levelling up white paper."

Ahead of the 2025 Conservative Party Conference, former Conservative MP Justine Greening argued that the party's failure to transform "zeitgeisty rhetoric on levelling up into policy reality" was a major contributor to the party's defeat at the 2024 General Election. She also warned that the Labour Party and Reform UK faced similar electoral challenges if they failed to match their party rhetoric on social mobility with "successful delivery of fairer outcomes". Speaking on the Lord Speaker’s Corner podcast in December 2025, Michael Gove argued that he was unable to make progress on the levelling up agenda due to "scepticism from other departments" when it came to devolving aspects of their own policy areas.

=== Reception of the white paper ===
The white paper has been scrutinised by former Shadow Secretary of State for Levelling Up, Housing and Communities Lisa Nandy, Metro Mayor of the Liverpool City Region Steve Rotheram, The Times and the Institute for Fiscal Studies. Trades Union Congress general secretary Frances O'Grady said that the white paper "fails to provide a serious plan for decent jobs". Fraser Myers in Spiked wrote that the white paper doesn't "come close to mobilising the resources needed" to level up.

The white paper was also criticised for recycling previous policy announcements. Bristol North West MP Darren Jones, who was the then Chair of the House of Commons Business, Energy and Industrial Strategy Committee commented that 8 out of the 12 Missions in the White Paper had been "rehashed" from the National Industrial Strategy, with the only new targets being for improving school performance, cutting crime and to "restore local pride". Journalists at The Independent discovered that parts of the document had been plagiarised from Wikipedia articles on Constantinople and the list of largest cities throughout history.

Other groups were more supportive in their response to the White Paper. Many local authorities, LEP Boards and other local institutions welcomed the White Paper confirming investments in their region. Various groups in the private pensions sector welcomed the White Paper's commitment to direct more money from Local Government Pension Scheme pots to support investment in local areas. The Railway Industry Association, the Social Market Foundation and TechUK welcomed the White Paper's investment commitments in railway infrastructure, skills and R&D, respectively. The Catholic Union of Great Britain welcomed the White Paper's recognition of the role of faith groups in delivering on the Levelling Up agenda.

=== Labour Party ===
The Leader of the Labour Party Sir Keir Starmer said in October 2022 that a future Labour government would "pick up the challenge of levelling up", but that his party believed only they would be able to deliver it, calling Boris Johnson's plan to deliver levelling up "an empty slogan".

In April 2024, Labour announced that it would scrap the slogan in government. After Labour's landslide victory in the 2024 general election in July 2024, it was announced that the Department for Levelling Up, Housing and Communities would revert to its pre-Johnson era name of the Ministry of Housing, Communities and Local Government.

In October 2025, research by the Independent Commission on Neighbourhoods found that Keir Starmer’s government "invested £2bn more" on levelling up-style initiatives than Johnson did in his first year, with £4.5bn allocated to regional investment programmes in Labour’s first year, compared with £2.5bn spent in the equivalent period under Johnson.

In February 2026, Starmer launched the government's new "Pride In Place" policy, which officially replaced all outstanding levelling up funding and initiatives.

== See also ==
- Assisted areas (United Kingdom)
- North–South divide in the United Kingdom
- Poverty in the United Kingdom
- Regions of England
- Regional development
