= Regional policy of the European Union =

Regional policy of the EU

The Regional Policy of the European Union (EU), also referred as Cohesion Policy, is a policy with the stated aim of improving the economic well-being of regions in the European Union and also to avoid regional disparities. More than one third of the EU's budget is devoted to this policy, which aims to remove economic, social and territorial disparities across the EU, restructure declining industrial areas and diversify rural areas which have declining agriculture. In doing so, EU regional policy is geared towards making regions more competitive, fostering economic growth and creating new jobs. The policy also has a role to play in wider challenges for the future, including climate change, energy supply and globalisation.

The EU's regional policy covers all European regions, although regions across the EU fall in different categories (so-called objectives), depending mostly on their economic situation. Between 2007 and 2013, EU regional policy consisted of three objectives: Convergence, Regional competitiveness and employment, and European territorial cooperation; the previous three objectives (from 2000 to 2006) were simply known as Objectives 1, 2 and 3.

The policy constitutes the main investment policy of the EU, and is due to account for around one third of its budget, or EUR 392 billion over the period of 2021-2027. In its long-term budget, the EU's Cohesion policy gives particular attention to regions where economic development is below the EU average.

== Notion of territorial cohesion ==
Territorial cohesion is a European Union concept which builds on the European Spatial Development Perspective (ESDP). The main idea of territorial cohesion is to contribute to European sustainable development and competitiveness. It is intended to strengthen the European regions, promote territorial integration and produce coherence of European Union (EU) policies so as to contribute to the sustainable development and global competitiveness of the EU. Sustainable development is defined as development that "meets the needs of the present without compromising the ability of future generations to meet their own needs".

The main aim of the territorial cohesion policy is to contribute to a balanced distribution of economic and social resources among the European regions with the priority on the territorial dimension. This means that resources and opportunities should be equally distributed among the regions and their populations. In order to achieve the goal of territorial cohesion, an integrative approach to other EU policies is required.

== Objectives ==
Classification of regions from 2021 to 2027: Less developed regions Transition regions More developed regions

Classification of regions from 2014 to 2020: Less developed regions Transition regions More developed regions

Eligibility of regions for different objectives from 2007 to 2013: Eligible under Convergence objective Phasing out eligibility under Convergence objectives Eligible under Regional competitiveness and employment objective Phasing in eligibility under Regional competitiveness and employment objective.

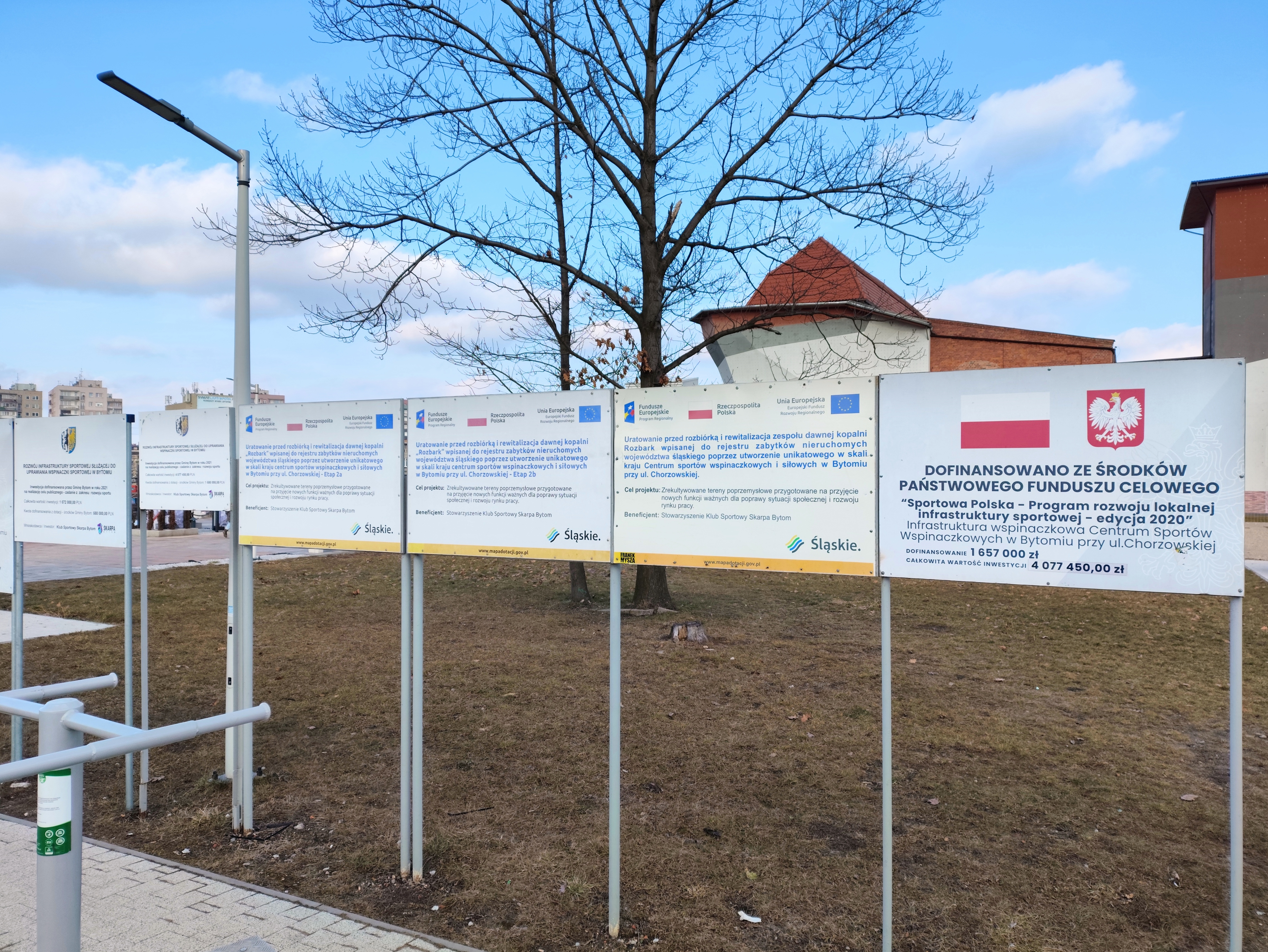
Info signs of European Regional Development Fund at monument renovation site in Poland

=== Less developed regions ===
By far the largest amount of regional policy funding is dedicated to the regions designated as less developed. This covers Europe's poorest regions whose per capita gross domestic product (GDP) is less than 75% of the EU average. This includes nearly all the regions of the new member states, most of Southern Italy, Greece and Portugal, and some parts of the United Kingdom and Spain.

With the addition of the newest member countries in 2004 and 2007, the EU average GDP fell. As a result, some regions in the EU's "old" member states, which used to be eligible for funding under the Convergence objective, became above the 75% threshold. These regions received transitional, "phasing out" support during the previous funding period of 2007–13. Regions that used to be covered under the convergence criteria but got above the 75% threshold even within the EU-15 received "phasing-in" support through the Regional competitiveness and employment objective. Despite the large investment requirements of the EU, cohesion areas continue to have lower investment rates. Only 77% of businesses in transitional regions and 75% of those in less developed regions invested, compared to 79% of businesses in more developed regions.

Financial limitations are more common in less developed areas, especially for small and medium-sized enterprises (SMEs). SMEs in these regions are more than twice as likely (11%) than their counterparts in transition (5%) and non-cohesion zones (5%) to report having financial difficulties. Less developed regions also have the lowest percentage of businesses who have made investments to combat climate change or reduce their carbon emissions, at 46%. In 2022, lending from the EIB Group under the SME/mid-cap financing policy reached €3.5 billion.

In less developed regions, bank loans account for 49% of finance. Grants make up a larger portion of the financing in less developed areas, accounting for 13% of external financing.

Many regions in Southern Europe and transition regions in higher-income Member States have seen economic downturn and population declines. There has been general growth in GDP per capita and employment, but regional differences within EU nations remain, with considerable discrepancies between capital and non-capital areas, particularly in younger Member States.

Women's participation in the workforce, including older women, has grown significantly in recent years, though notable regional differences remain. In cohesion regions, women's employment rates are considerably lower than men's, with gender gaps in employment reaching as high as 30% in parts of Southern Europe.

==== Areas designated as less developed from 2014 to 2020 ====
- Bulgaria – all (except Southwestern region)
- Croatia - all
- Czech Republic – all (except Prague)
- Estonia – all
- France – French Guiana, Guadeloupe, Martinique, Réunion
- Greece – Anatoliki Makedonia Thraki, Dytiki Ellada, Ipeiros, Kentriki Makedonia, Thessalia
- Hungary – all (except Central Hungary)
- Italy – Basilicata, Calabria, Campania, Apulia, Sicily
- Latvia – all
- Lithuania – all
- Poland – all (except the Warsaw Metro NUTS2 Unit carved out of Masovian Voivodeship)
- Portugal – Alentejo, Azores, Centro, Norte
- Romania – all (except Bucharest)
- Slovakia – all (except Bratislava)
- Slovenia – Vzhodna Slovenija
- Spain – Extremadura
- United Kingdom – Cornwall and the Isles of Scilly, West Wales and the Valleys

=== Transition regions ===
These are regions whose GDP per capita falls between 75 and 90 percent of the EU average. As such, they receive less funding than the less developed regions but more funding than the more developed regions.

In transition regions, bank loans account for 69% of finance. Particularly transitional regions appear to profit from investments in more developed regions. There is a 34% of the impact on GDP and 47% of the impact on employment in some circumstances.

In the green transition, 19% of firms in transition regions claim that climate change is significantly affecting their business, while 43% believe climate change has a minor effect. 25% of businesses in transition regions can also be categorized as "green and digital".

==== Areas designated as transition regions from 2014 to 2020 ====
- Austria – Burgenland
- Belgium – all of Wallonia (except Walloon Brabant)
- Denmark – Sjælland
- France – Auvergne, Corsica, Franche-Comté, Languedoc-Roussillon, Limousin, Lorraine, Lower Normandy, Nord-Pas-de-Calais, Picardy, Poitou-Charentes
- Germany – Lüneburg, and all of the former East Germany except Berlin and Leipzig
- Greece – Dytiki Makedonia, Ionia Nisia, Kriti, Peloponnisos, Sterea Ellada, Voreio Aigaio
- Italy – Abruzzo, Molise, Sardinia
- Malta – all
- Poland - none
- Portugal – Algarve
- Spain – Andalucía, Canarias, Castilla-La Mancha, Melilla, Murcia
- United Kingdom – Cumbria, Devon, East Yorkshire and Northern Lincolnshire, Highlands and Islands, Lancashire, Lincolnshire, Merseyside, Northern Ireland, Shropshire and Staffordshire, South Yorkshire, Tees Valley and Durham
- Bulgaria – Southwestern region

=== More developed regions ===
This covers all European regions that are not covered elsewhere, namely those which have a GDP per capita above 90 percent of the EU average. The main aim of funding for these regions is to create jobs by promoting competitiveness and making the regions concerned more attractive to businesses and investors. Possible projects include developing clean transport, supporting research centres, universities, small businesses and start-ups, providing training, and creating jobs. Funding is managed through either the ERDF or the ESF.

In all regions, bank loans are the most prevalent type of external financing. In more developed regions, they account for 58% of finance.

==== Areas designated as more developed regions from 2014 to 2020 ====
- Austria – all (except Burgenland)
- Belgium – all of Flanders, Brussels, Walloon Brabant
- Cyprus – all
- Czech Republic – Prague
- Denmark – all (except Sjælland)
- Finland – all
- France – Alsace, Aquitaine, Burgundy, Brittany, Centre, Champagne-Ardenne, Île-de-France, Midi-Pyrénées, Pays de la Loire, Provence-Alpes-Côte d'Azur, Rhône-Alpes, Upper Normandy
- Germany – Berlin, Leipzig, all of the former West Germany (except Lüneburg)
- Greece – Attiki, Notio Aigaio
- Hungary – Közép-Magyarország
- Ireland – all
- Italy – Emilia-Romagna, Friuli-Venezia Giulia, Lazio, Liguria, Lombardy, Marche, Piedmont, South Tyrol, Trentino, Tuscany, Umbria, Valle d'Aosta, Veneto
- Luxembourg – all
- Netherlands – all
- Poland – the Warsaw Metro NUTS2 Unit carved out of Masovian Voivodeship
- Portugal – Lisbon region, Madeira
- Romania – Bucharest
- Slovakia – Bratislava
- Slovenia - Zahodna Slovenija
- Spain – Aragon, Asturias, Balearic Islands, Basque Country, Cantabria, Castilla y León, Catalonia, Ceuta, Galicia, La Rioja, Madrid Region, Navarre, Valencian Community
- Sweden – all
- United Kingdom – all of London, South East England, and the East of England, plus Dorset, Somerset, Gloucestershire, Wiltshire, Herefordshire, Worcestershire, Warwickshire, West Midlands, Leicestershire, Rutland, Northamptonshire, Derbyshire, Nottinghamshire, Cheshire, Greater Manchester, West Yorkshire, North Yorkshire, Tyne and Wear, Northumberland, South Western Scotland, Eastern Scotland, North Eastern Scotland and East Wales

=== European territorial cooperation ===
This objective aims to reduce the importance of borders within Europe – both between and within countries – by improving regional cooperation. It allows for three different types of cooperation: cross-border, transnational and interregional cooperation. The objective is currently by far the least important in pure financial terms, accounting for only 2.5% of the EU's regional policy budget. It is funded exclusively through the ERDF.

== Instruments and funding ==
The cohesion policy accounts for almost one third of the EU's budget, equivalent to almost EUR 352 billion over seven years in 2014-2020, and EUR 392 billion in 2021-2027, dedicated to the promotion of economic development and job creation, and for helping communities and nations get ready for the European Union's transition to a more sustainable and digital economy. Cohesion lending had a large percentage of contributions to climate and environmental goals in 2021 and 2022. Sustainable energy and natural resources accounted for €10.2 billion, or 34% of overall European Investment Bank cohesion loans, compared to 26% for non-cohesion regions. 52% of loans in the European Union for sustainability (€19.6 billion) went to projects in cohesion areas.

The main resource of EU's territorial cohesion policy is EU's structural funds. There are two structural funds available to all EU regions: the European Regional Development Fund (ERDF) and the European Social Fund (ESF). The ERDF is intended to be used for the creation of infrastructure and productive job-creating investment and it is mainly for the businesses, while the ESF is meant to contribute to the integration of the unemployed populations into the work life via training measurements. The funds are managed and delivered in partnership between the European Commission, the Member States and stakeholders at the local and regional level. In the 2014–2020 funding period, money is allocated differently between regions that are deemed to be "more developed" (with GDP per capita over 90% of the EU average), "transition" (between 75% and 90%), and "less developed" (less than 75%), and additional funds are set aside for member states with GNI per capita under 90 percent of the EU average in the Cohesion Fund. Funding for less developed regions, like the Convergence objective before it, aims to allow the regions affected to catch up with the EU's more prosperous regions, thereby reducing economic disparity within the European Union. Examples of types of projects funded under this objective include improving basic infrastructure, helping businesses, building or modernising waste and water treatment facilities, and improving access to high-speed Internet connections. Regional policy projects in less developed regions are supported by three European funds: the European Regional Development Fund (ERDF), the European Social Fund (ESF) and the Cohesion Fund.

The European Investment Bank (EIB) has pledged to increasing its support for certain regions in its Cohesion Orientation for 2021–2027. Between 2023 and 2024, the Bank plans to allocate at least 40% of the overall finance it provides to projects in cohesion regions, increasing to at least 45% starting in 2025. The less developed areas of Europe will get at least half of this allocation, and increasing regions that receive its climate action and environmental loans.

The European Investment Bank has given €44.7 billion to projects in cohesion areas for the European Union since 2021. Included in this is €24.8 billion in 2022 alone, or 46% of all EU signatures. From 2014 - 2020, they contributed a total of €123.8 billion to projects in cohesion areas. Financial instruments from the Bank have so far helped around 6,600 projects in Greece, Italy, Poland, Spain, Portugal, Lithuania, Romania, and Cyprus. In 2022, the EIB Group contributed €28.4 billion to initiatives in cohesion areas and €16.2 billion in climate action and environmental sustainability. 44% of the EIB Group's overall loan in the European Union in 2022—or €28.4 billion—went to projects in cohesion areas. In the same year, projects with a combined investment cost of €146 billion were backed by EIB loans across the EU. For the EU as a whole, the European Investment Bank invested €16.2 billion in climate action and environmental sustainability in 2022 in cohesion areas. This is over half of the EU's total EIB funding for climate change and environmental sustainability. In 2023, cohesion regions received 83% of the EIB's funding for urban and regional projects, and 65% of the funding for strategic transport projects was allocated to these areas.

Also in 2023, the European Investment Fund spent €14.9 billion in cohesion areas, partnering with 300 institutions throughout Europe to provide finance for over 350 000 small firms, infrastructure projects, homes, and individuals. This resulted in €134 billion for the real economy.

The European Union invested €14 billion, 49% of which focused on economic and social integration. These funds are intended to raise around €42.7 billion.

== See also ==
- Assisted areas (United Kingdom)
- Council of European Municipalities and Regions
- European Grouping for Territorial Cooperation
- European Structural and Investment Funds
- Euroregion
- List of micro-regional organizations
- Nomenclature of Territorial Units for Statistics – for how the EU defines regions
