= Selective Employment Tax =

Payroll levy in 1960s Britain

Selective Employment Payments Act 1966 (Note: Section 12(1).)
- Act of Parliament
- Parliament of the United Kingdom
- Long title: An Act to provide for payments in certain circumstances in respect of persons in respect of whom selective employment tax has been paid; and for connected purposes.
- Citation: 1966 c. 32
- Territorial extent: England and Wales; Scotland; (Note: Section 12(2).)

Dates
- Royal assent: 9 August 1966
- Commencement: 9 August 1966 (Note: The Acts of Parliament (Commencement) Act 1793.)
- Repealed: 27 July 1972
Other legislation
Amended by	Theft Act 1968; Civil Aviation Act 1971
Repealed by	Finance Act 1972

Status: Repealed

Text of statute as originally enacted

Selective Employment Tax (SET) was a weekly payroll tax in the United Kingdom. It was levied against employers at an initial flat rate of 25s per man, and 12s 6d per woman.

SET was intended to subsidise manufacturing industry from the proceeds of the services industries, to help exports. At the end of each accounting period, manufacturing companies would have their SET payments refunded, along with a 7s 6d bounty or premium per employee (SEP). The premium was withdrawn outside assisted areas (United Kingdom) in 1967, while a Regional Employment Premium was introduced payable at fixed amounts for employees still eligible for SEP.

SET was designed to be a tax on those companies that did not boost UK exports. High-street bookmakers used the introduction of this tax as a reason to reduce the payout on some each-way bets (where a horse is placed in the first two or three, depending on the number of runners) from a quarter the odds to a fifth the odds. However, the previous, larger payouts were never restored when the tax ended.

This tax was introduced during the first Wilson ministry in 1966, by means of the Selective Employment Payments Act 1966 (c. 32). It was dropped in favour of the introduction of VAT by the Heath ministry of 1970–1974. Regional Employment Premiums were withdrawn as part of the response to the 1976 sterling crisis.

SET Contribution Rates
Effective Date	Man over 18	Woman over 18	Boy under 18	Girl under 18
5 Sept 1966	25s	12s 6d	12s 6d	8s
2 Sept 1968	37s 6d	18s 9d	18s 9d	12s
7 July 1969	48s	24s	24s	16s
15 Feb 1971	£2.40	£1.20	£1.20	£0.80
5 July 1971	£1.20	£0.60	£0.60	£0.40
2 Apr 1973	0	0	0	0
