= Ocean Kinetics =

Ocean Kinetics Limited
- Company type: Private
- Industry: Aquaculture & Fishing; Decommissioning; Oil and Gas; Marine; Renewables; Power& Utilities
- Founded: 1992 in Shetland, Scotland, United Kingdom
- Founder: John Henderson
- Headquarters: Lerwick Shetland, United Kingdom
- Areas served: Most of the United Kingdom
- Key people: John Henderson
- Products: Fabrication; Machining & Manufacture; Inspection and Testing; Certified Materials; Diving; Trades Provision
- Number of employees: 90
- Website: www.oceankinetics.co.uk

Ocean Kinetics is a private limited engineering company based in Lerwick, Scotland. The company was established by John Henderson in 1992 to specialise in marine engineering solutions.

== History ==
Established in 1992, the company expanded to an engineering company in fabrication, oil and gas, renewables, fishing, and aquaculture. The first purpose-built buildings of the company were opened in 1998, and as the company grew, an extension was added in 2000, and additional stores were built in 2002.

Ocean Kinetics expanded its premises in 2012 after announcing its expansion plans of £2M, of which £240,000 of funding was provided by Highlands and Islands Enterprise (HIE) and £500,000 funded by the Regional Selective Assistance (RSA) scheme.

In 2015, the firm was called upon to carry out repairs at the Antarctic Rothera Research Station.

A supply partnership with John Bell Pipeline was also strengthened in August 2015 to help increase the sales volume in the United Kingdom and overseas.
