= Vestfold og Telemark County Municipality =

Vestfold og Telemark County Municipality Vestfold og Telemark fylkeskommune
- County
- Coat of arms

- Location in Norway
- Coordinates: 59.495°N 8.673°E
- Country: Norway
- Established: 1 January 2020
- Dissolved: 1 January 2024
- Administrative center: Skien

Government
  - County mayor: Terje Riis-Johansen
- ISO 3166 code: NO-38
- Schools: 21
- Pupils: 14,000

Vestfold og Telemark County Municipality (Norwegian: Vestfold og Telemark fylkeskommune) was the democratically elected regional governing administration of Vestfold og Telemark county in Norway. This county was established by the merger of the old Vestfold and Telemark counties on 1 January 2020. The merger was very unpopular and the new county was dissolved on 1 January 2024 when the merger from 2020 was undone by the Storting.

== County government ==
The county municipality's most important tasks included secondary education, recreation (sports and outdoor life), and cultural heritage. The county municipality was also responsible for all county roads (including ferry operations) and public transport (including school busses). The county municipality had further responsibility for regional land-use planning, business development, power production, and environmental management. The county also had responsibility for providing dental health services (in 2002, responsibility for hospitals and public medicine was transferred from the counties to the new regional health authorities).

=== County mayor ===
The county mayor (Norwegian: fylkesordfører) of Vestfold og Telemark was the political leader of the county and the chairperson of the county council. Terje Riis-Johansen was the only county mayor that served this county during its short existence.

=== County council ===
The county council (Norwegian: Fylkestinget) was made up of 61 representatives that were elected by direct election by all legal residents of the county every fourth year. The council was the legislative body for the county. The county council typically met about six times a year. Council members were divided into standing committees and an executive committee (fylkesutvalg), which met considerably more often. Both the council and executive committee (with at least 5 members) were led by the county mayor (Norwegian: fylkesordfører). The executive committee carried out the executive functions of the county under the direction of the whole council. The tables below show the historical composition of the council by political party. Since this county only existed for 4 years, it only had one election and one council.

Vestfold og Telemark fylkesting 2020–2023
Party name (in Norwegian)	Number of representatives
Labour Party (Arbeiderpartiet)	18
People's Action No to More Road Tolls (Folkeaksjonen nei til mer bompenger)	1
Progress Party (Fremskrittspartiet)	6
Green Party (Miljøpartiet De Grønne)	4
Conservative Party (Høyre)	14
Christian Democratic Party (Kristelig Folkeparti)	2
Red Party (Rødt)	2
Centre Party (Senterpartiet)	9
Socialist Left Party (Sosialistisk Venstreparti)	3
Liberal Party (Venstre)	2
Total number of members:	61
