= Snurråsen =

Village in Siljan Municipality, Norway

- Village
- Interactive map of Snurråsen
- Coordinates: 59.29124°N 9.7127°E
- Country: Norway
- Region: Eastern Norway
- County: Telemark
- District: Grenland
- Municipality: Siljan Municipality

Area
  - Total: 0.15 km^{2} (0.058 sq mi)
- Elevation: 134 m (440 ft)

Population (2025)
  - Total: 246
  - Density: 1,640/km^{2} (4,200/sq mi)
- Time zone: UTC+01:00 (CET)
  - Summer (DST): UTC+02:00 (CEST)
- Post Code: 3748 Siljan

Snurråsen is a village in Siljan Municipality in Telemark county, Norway. The village is located along the Siljanelva river, about 2 kilometres (1.2 mi) to the north of the village of Siljan. Siljan Church is located on the south side of Snurråsen.

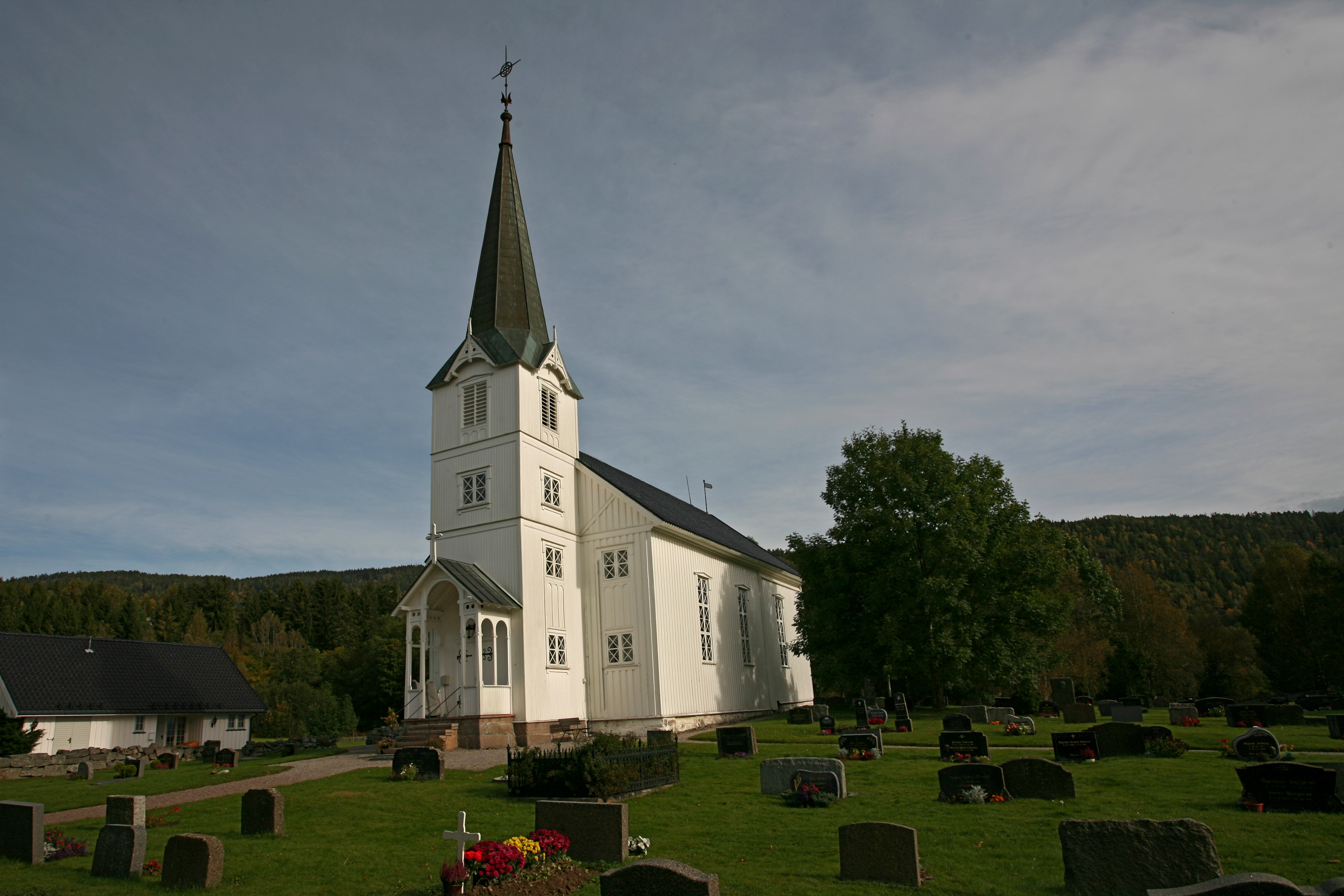
View of the local Siljan Church

The 0.15-square-kilometre (37-acre) village has a population (2025) of 246 and a population density of 1,640 inhabitants per square kilometre (4,200/sq mi).
