= European charter for equality of women and men in local life =

2006 Council of Europe charter

The Council of European Municipalities and Regions launched in May 2006 a European charter for equality of women and men in local life. This charter is addressed to the local and regional governments of Europe, who are invited to sign it, to make a formal public commitment to the principle of equality of women and men, and to implement, within their territory, the commitments set out within the Charter.

== The six fundamental principles ==
- Equality of women and men is a fundamental right
- In order to ensure the equality of women and men, multiple discriminations based on ethnic origin, disability, sexual orientation, religion, socio economic status... must also be addressed
- The balanced participation of women and men in decision-making is necessary for a democratic society
- Gender stereotypes and the attitudes and assumptions that arise from them must be eliminated
- A gender perspective must be taken into account in all activities of local and regional government
- Properly resourced action plans need to be drawn up and implemented.

== Background to the charter ==
CEMR has always worked to eliminate all types of discriminations, including men or women equality issues.

Throughout 2005, CEMR, with the financial support of the European Commission, led a project on The town for equality. That project aimed mainly at collecting best practice cases of gender equality in European local governments as well as at setting up a methodology to help local representatives achieve true gender equality in their municipalities.

At the end of the project, CEMR, still with the support of the European Commission, started a new project to draft a European charter for equality of women and men in local life. Its aim was to encourage local politicians to sign it, thus committing themselves publicly to implement the measures in the charter in their municipalities.
