= Siljan Church =

Church in Telemark, Norway

- Siljan kirke
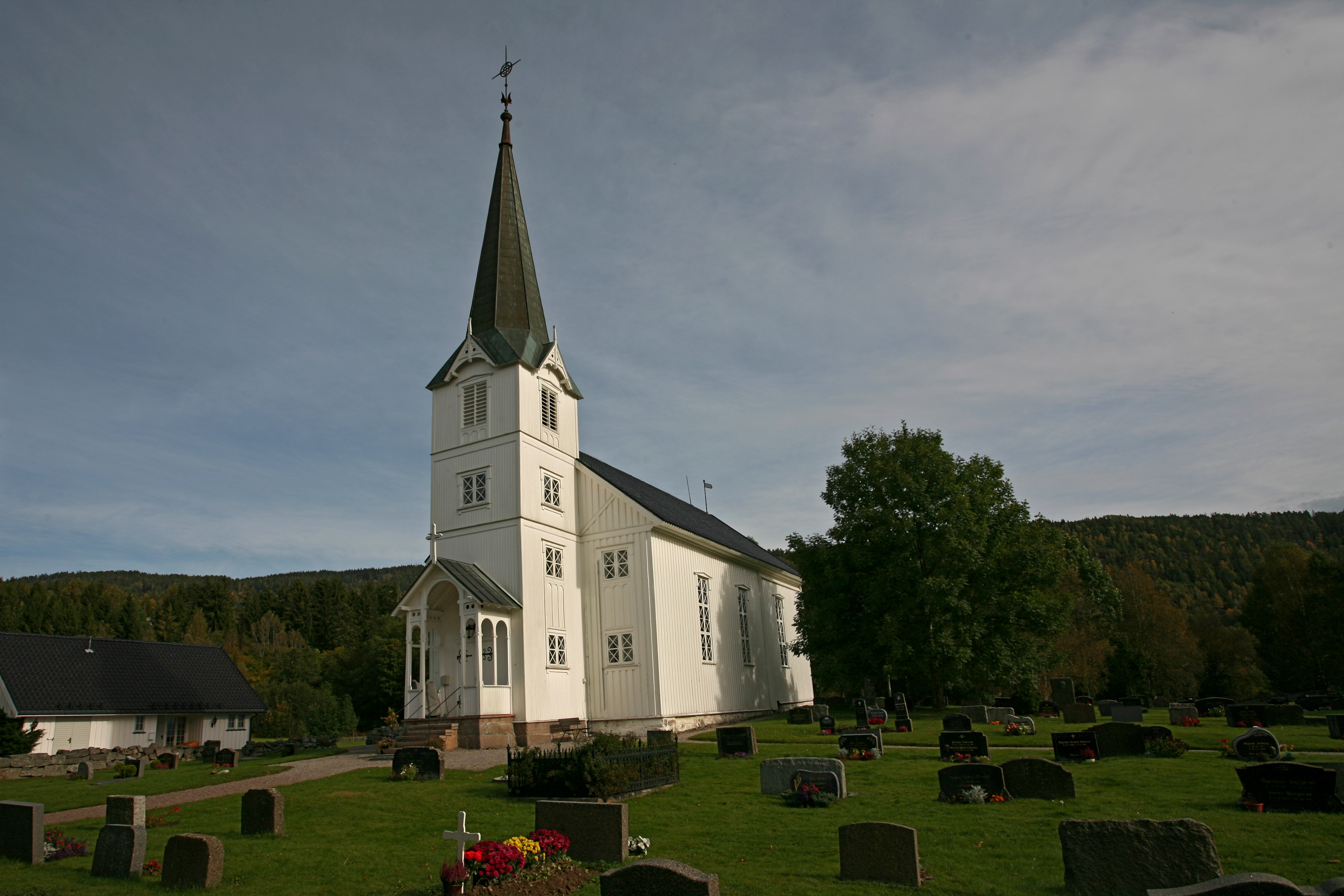
- View of the church
- Siljan Church
- 59°17′18″N 9°42′42″E
- Location: Siljan Municipality, Telemark
- Country: Norway
- Denomination: Church of Norway
- Previous denomination: Catholic Church
- Churchmanship: Evangelical Lutheran

History
- Status: Parish church
- Founded: 10th century

Architecture
- Functional status: Active
- Architectural type: Long church
- Completed: c. 1150 (876 years ago)

Specifications
- Capacity: 180
- Materials: Stone

Administration
- Diocese: Agder og Telemark
- Deanery: Skien prosti
- Parish: Siljan
- Norwegian Cultural Heritage Site
- Type: Church
- Status: Automatically protected
- ID: 85431

Siljan Church (Norwegian: Siljan kirke) is a parish church of the Church of Norway in Siljan Municipality in Telemark county, Norway. It is located in the village of Snurråsen. It is the church for the Siljan parish which is part of the Skien prosti (deanery) in the Diocese of Agder og Telemark. The white, stone church was built in a long church design in the late 12th century using plans drawn up by an unknown architect. The church seats about 180 people.

== History ==
The earliest existing historical records of the church date back to the year 1398, but the church was not built that year. The first church in Siljan (then known as Slemdal) was a wooden post church that was built in the late 10th century. After a couple of hundred years, the church fell into disrepair and it was replaced with a new stone church on the same site. The stone church was built during the second half of the 12th century. The village was almost wiped out by the Black Death and did not have its own priest for awhile after that.

The church was repaired in 1619 and again in 1736. By the 19th century, the population had increased to such an extent that there was a question of either expanding the old church or tearing it down and building a new church. In 1838, the church was renovated and enlarged. The old west wall was removed and a new wooden, timber-framed nave was built out from the west end of the old church. Then, the old nave became the new choir and the old choir became a sacristy. The old medieval parts that remained were clad with wood inside and partly outside so that it would match with the new wooden addition. Some more modernization work was completed in 1865. In 1903, a new church porch and bell tower were built on the west end of the church. Right after the war, the church was restored by partially uncovering of the medieval church walls of the choir and sacristy. In 1966–1970, the medieval choir (which had become the sacristy) was opened up so it could be seen from the nave.

== Media gallery ==
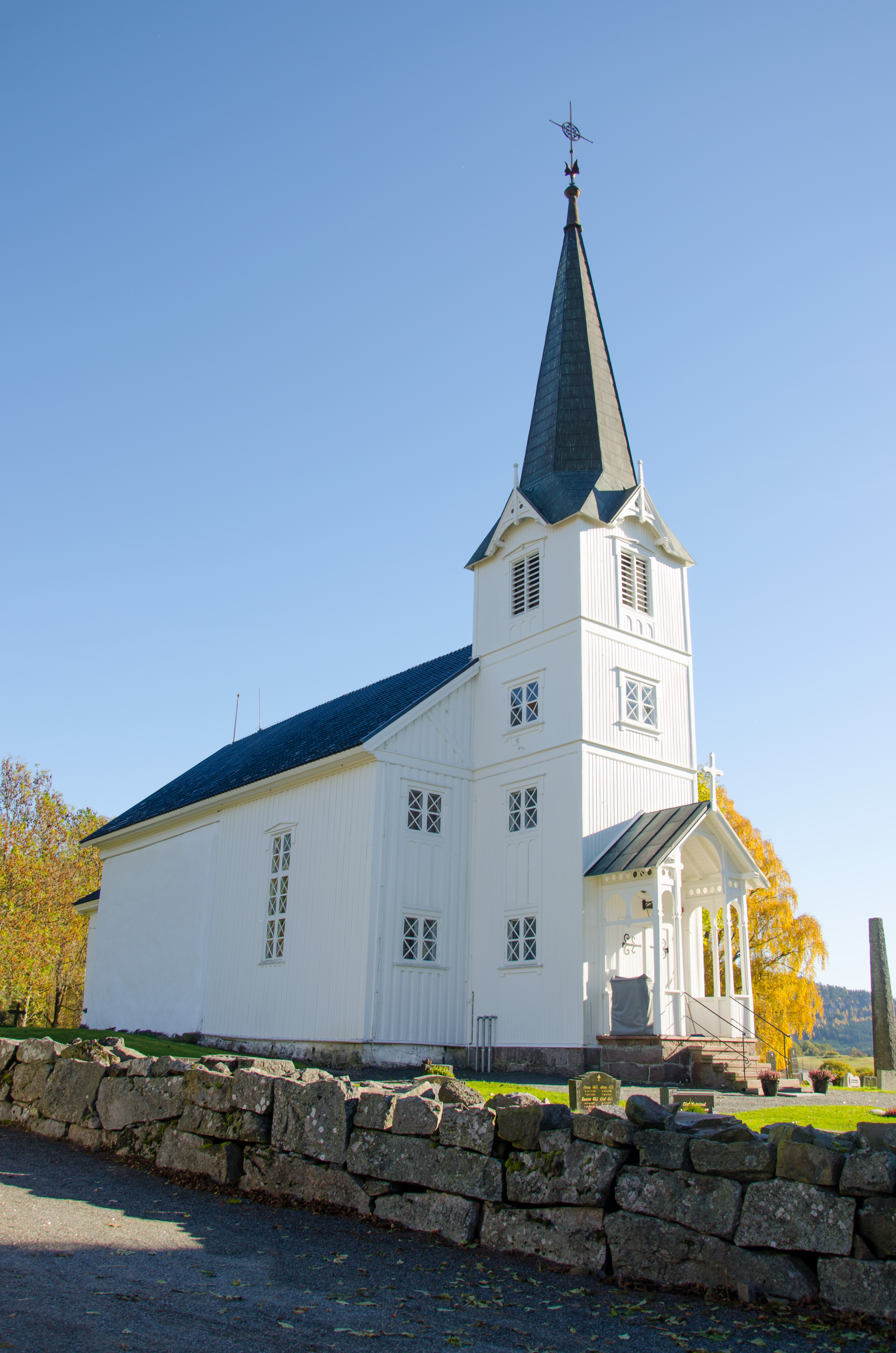

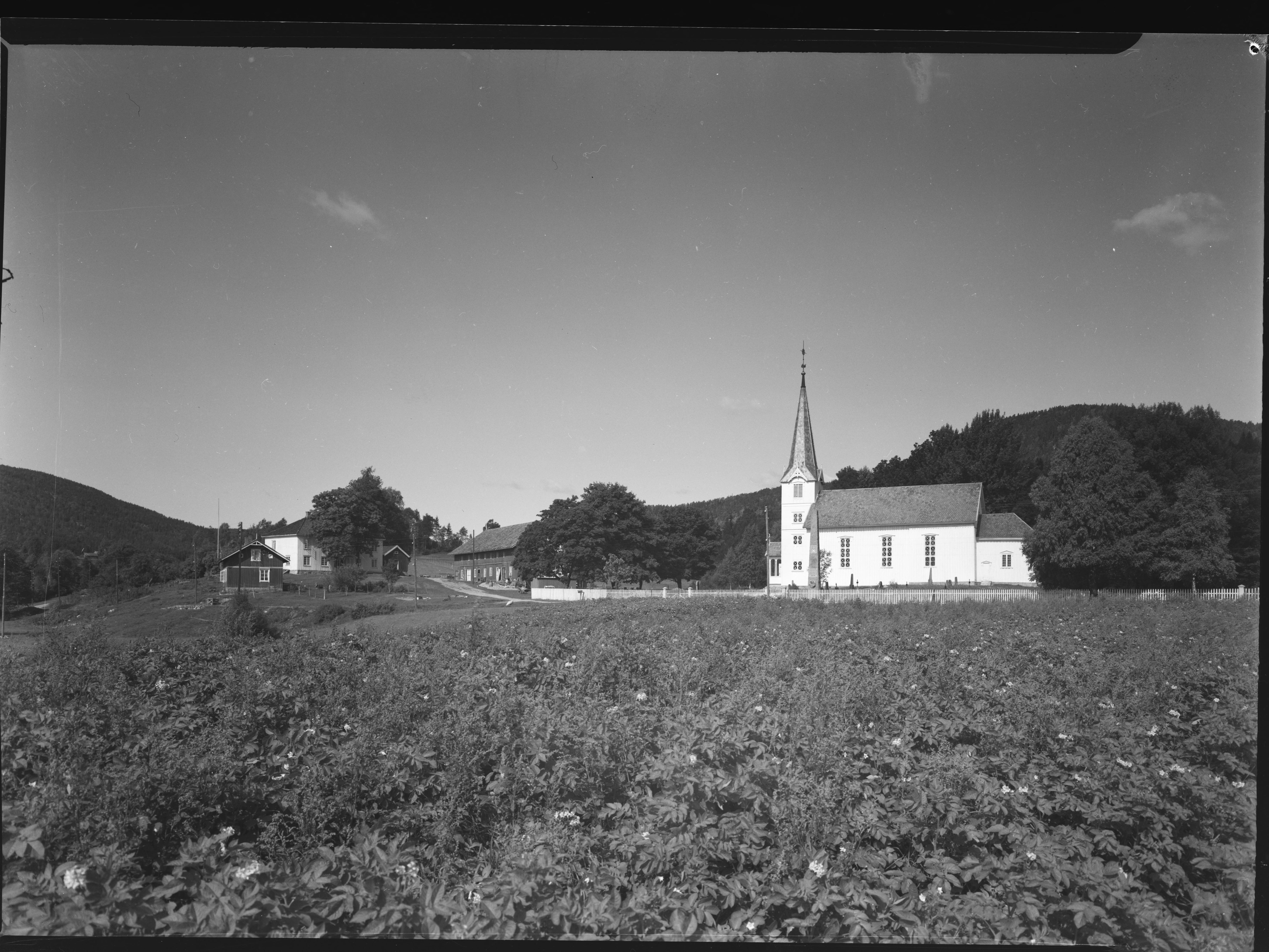

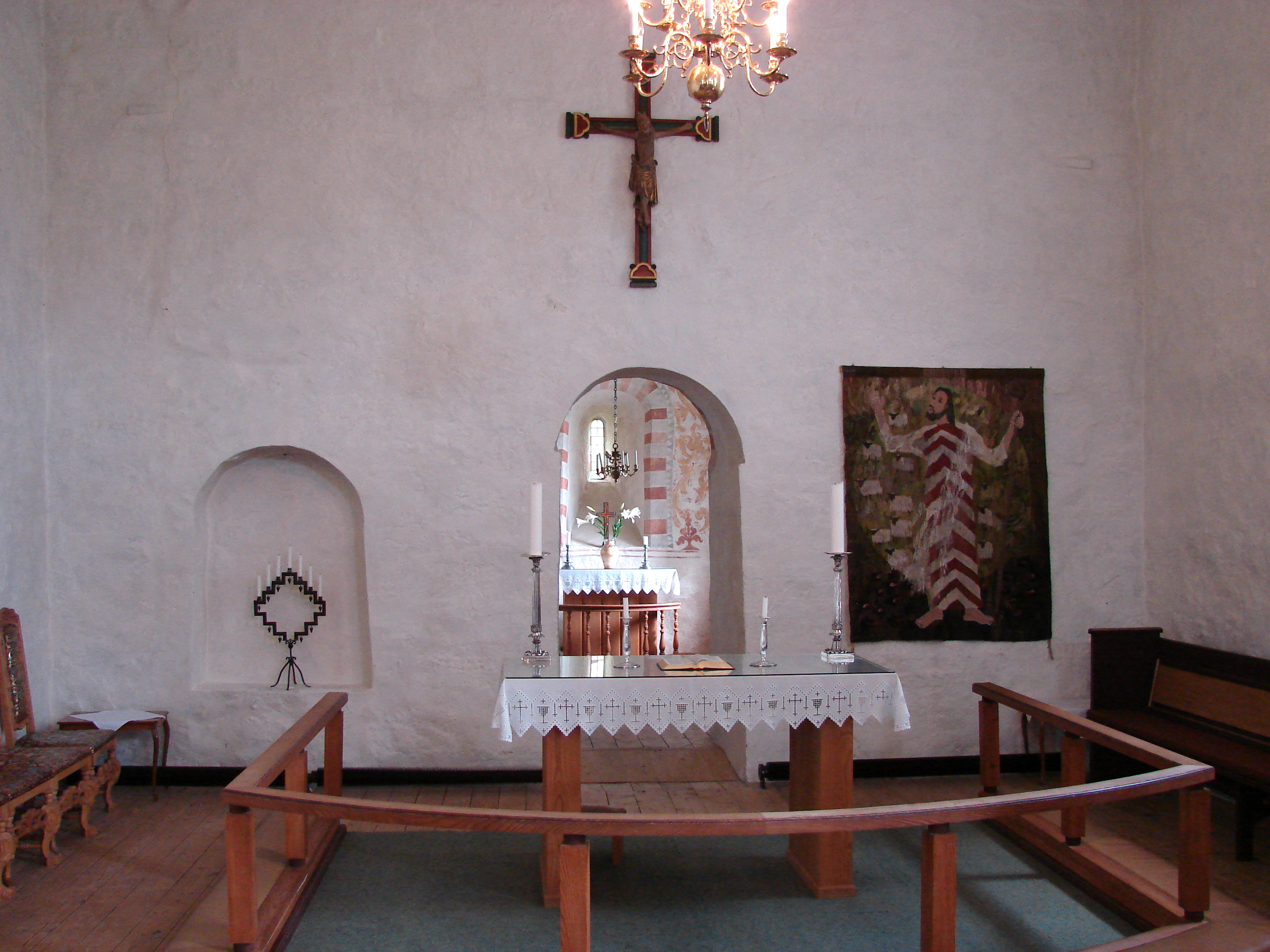

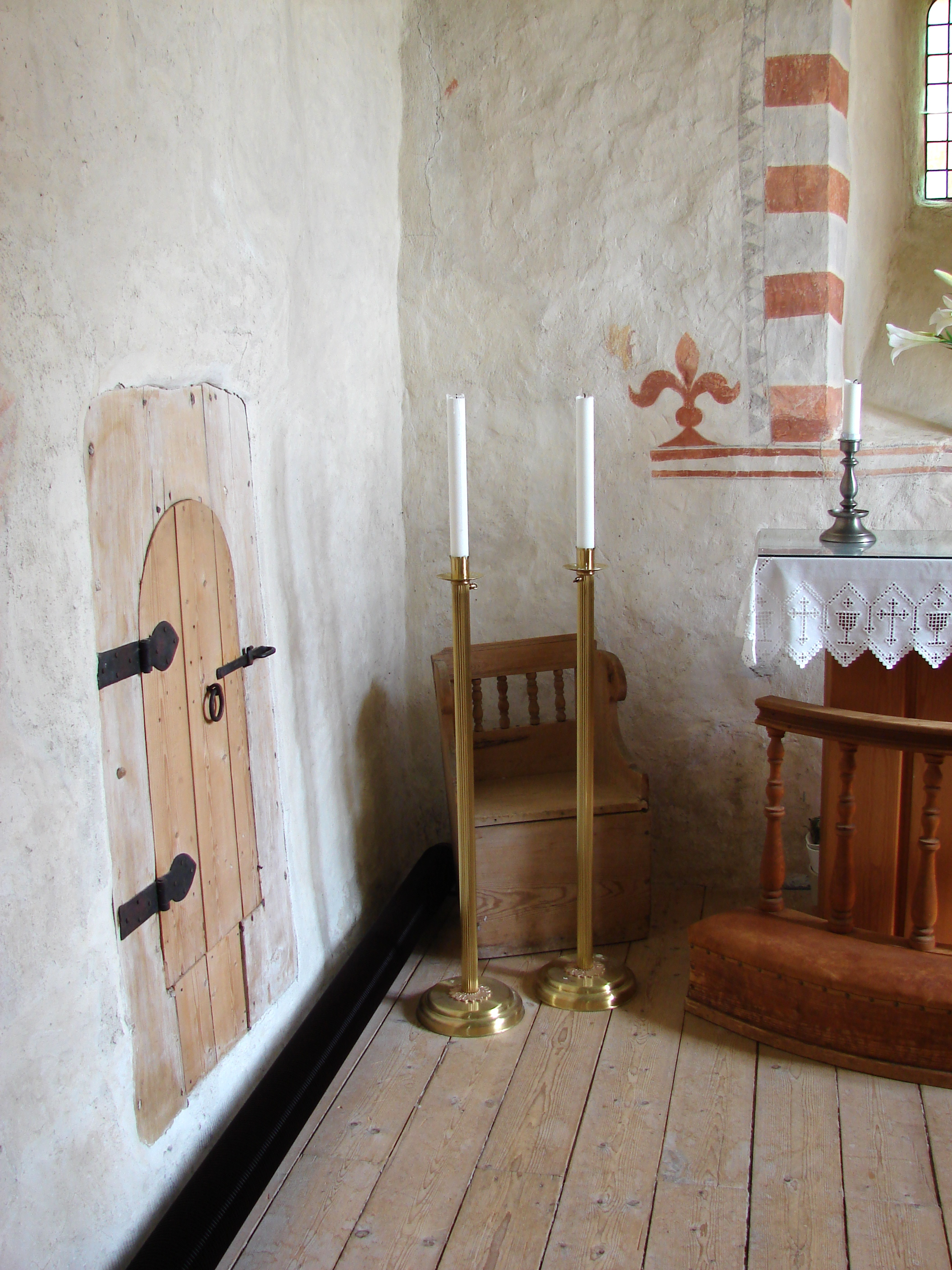

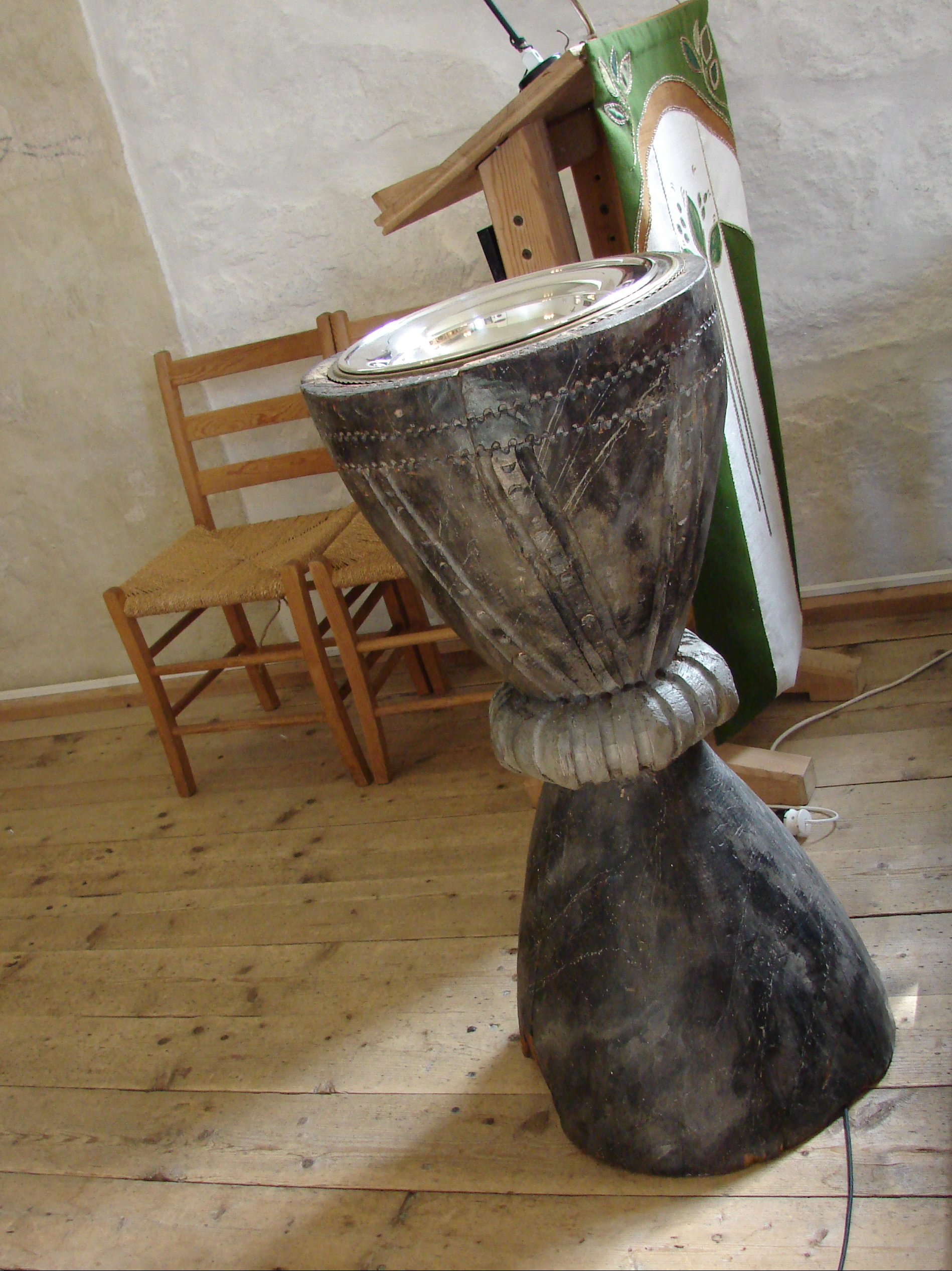

== See also ==
- List of churches in Agder og Telemark
