= Assisted areas (United Kingdom) =

Assisted areas in the United Kingdom are those areas selected for the application of regional policy to support employment. They date back to depressed special areas identified before WWII for specific assistance. Over time the support systems have changed, as have the designated areas. While the UK was a member of the European Union, the coverage and schemes were regulated as part of the EU's regional policy.

During Brexit negotiation much new grant support was suspended. From 2021 a new UK Levelling-up policy of the British government was developed.

== 2007-2013 map ==
The assisted areas of Great Britain are based upon a map drawn up and agreed with the European Commission in October 2006. The map was approved by the European Commission in December 2006 and will run from 2007 until 2013.

Under new EU guidelines, the proportion of the UK population covered by Assisted Areas has been reduced from 30.9% in the period from 2000 to 2006, to 23.9%. This reduction is a result of recent EU enlargement and the success of the UK economy leading to 2016.

The basis of the map is to provide Tier 1 and Tier 2 areas for Regional Selective Assistance grants (RSA), recently re-titled as Selective Finance for Investment in the English Regions (SFI), but remaining as RSA in Wales and Scotland, and additionally large areas of the UK, where a lower level of grant aid can also be made available to small and medium-sized enterprises. These areas are classified as Tier 3 (see tab England Tier 3), - this grant scheme is known as Enterprise Grant Scheme (EGS) for English companies, Assembly Investment Grant (AIG) for Welsh companies and Invest for Growth Scheme (IFG) for Scottish companies.

However, government aid can be only be provided by these current grant scheme within the constricts set out the European Commission, which among other constraints require a degree of proof that a project will not proceed without the requested grant aid.

== England ==
Responsibility for delivery of the schemes in England is mainly from 1 April that of the regional development agencies for RSA grants, whilst the Small Business Service handles both EGS and SMART, although larger RSA applications still have a direct involvement in the decision taking process by the DTI (over £2M).

== Scotland ==
Scotland has its own variant schemes of RSA and the smaller grant, IFG scheme, both administered by the Scottish Executive. Again, this is a devolved department, directly under the auspices of the Scottish Parliament.

== Wales ==
In Wales, both RSA and the new AIG, small grant scheme, are administered by the Welsh Government from offices in Cardiff, Swansea for South Wales, and Colwyn Bay for North Wales areas.
