= Gunn Marit Helgesen =

Norwegian politician (born 1958)

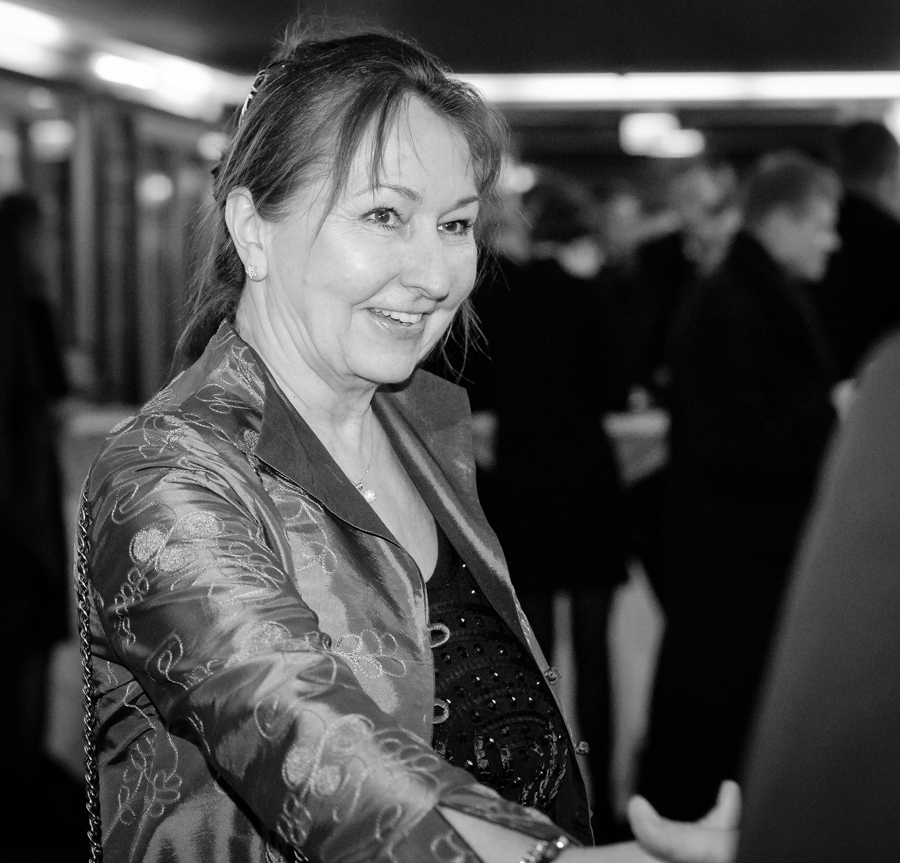
Gunn Marit Portrait

Gunn Marit Helgesen (born 30 October 1958) is a Norwegian politician for the Conservative Party.

Helgesen served as a deputy representative to the Parliament of Norway during the terms 1993–1997, 1997–2001, 2001–2005, 2005–2009 and 2009–2013. In total she met during 68 days of parliamentary session. From 1995 to 2003 she was deputy county mayor of Telemark, and from 2003 she was county mayor. After the 2011 Norwegian local elections the local centre-right alliance was dissolved, and Terje Riis-Johansen became county mayor of a new centre-left coalition. She succeeded Halvdan Skard in December 2013 as chair of the Norwegian Association of Local and Regional Authorities.

She is also president of the North Sea Commission. and a board member of Kommunal Landspensjonskasse.

Political offices
| Preceded by Andreas Kjær | County mayor of Telemark; 2003–2011 | Succeeded by Terje Riis-Johansen |
Civic offices
| Preceded by Halvdan Skard | Chair of the Norwegian Association of Local and Regional Authorities; 2013–present | Incumbent |
