= Siljan Municipality =

Municipality in Telemark, Norway

Siljan Municipality Siljan kommune
- Municipality
- Slemdal herred (historic name)
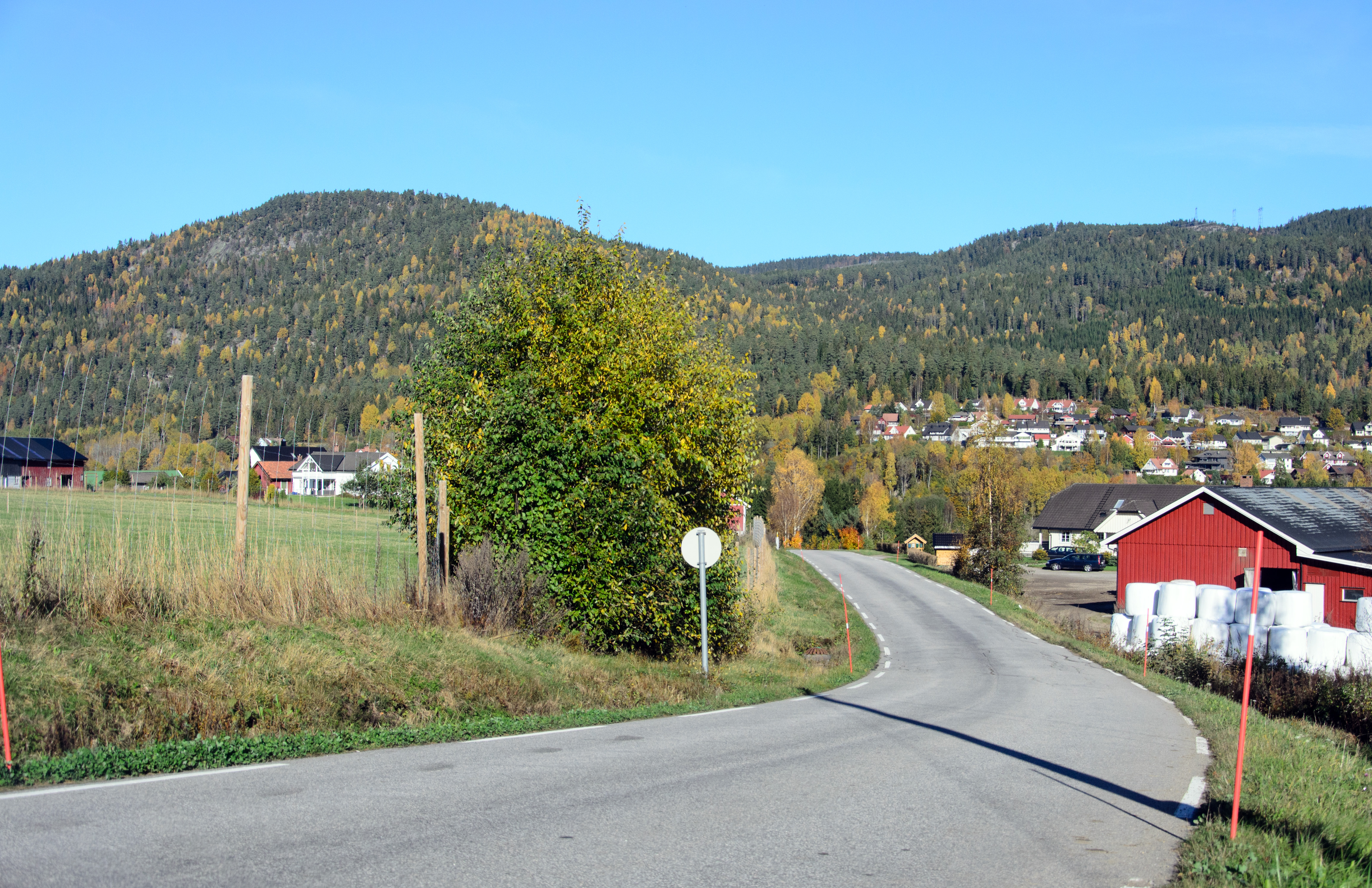
- View of the Høisetbakkane area

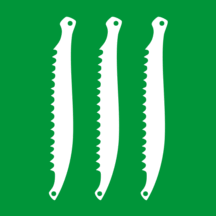
- Flag Coat of arms

- Telemark within Norway

- Siljan within Telemark
- Coordinates: 59°17′51″N 9°42′23″E
- Country: Norway
- County: Telemark
- District: Grenland
- Established: 1 Jan 1838
  - Created as: Formannskapsdistrikt
- Administrative centre: Siljan

Government
  - Mayor (2023): Elisabeth Hammer (KrF)

Area
  - Total: 213.95 km^{2} (82.61 sq mi)
  - Land: 202.21 km^{2} (78.07 sq mi)
  - Water: 11.74 km^{2} (4.53 sq mi) 5.5%
  - Rank: #300 in Norway
- Highest elevation (Nordre Bølene): 649.25 m (2,130.1 ft)

Population (2026)
  - Total: 2,377
  - Rank: #263 in Norway
  - Density: 11.8/km^{2} (31/sq mi)
  - Change (10 years): ▲ +1.8%
- Demonym: Siljansokning

Official language
  - Norwegian form: Neutral
- Time zone: UTC+01:00 (CET)
  - Summer (DST): UTC+02:00 (CEST)
- ISO 3166 code: NO-4010
- Website: Official website

Siljan (Norwegian pronunciation: [ˈsɪljɑn]; locally [ˈsɪʎːɑn]) is a municipality in Telemark county, Norway. It is located in the traditional district of Grenland. The administrative centre of the municipality is the village of Siljan. Other villages in Siljan include Snurråsen and Øverbø.

The 213.95-square-kilometre (82.61 sq mi) municipality is the 300th largest by area out of the 357 municipalities in Norway. Siljan Municipality is the 263rd most populous municipality in Norway with a population of 2,377. The municipality's population density is 11.8 inhabitants per square kilometre (31/sq mi) and its population has increased by 1.8% over the previous 10-year period.

The older main road that connects the cities of Skien, Larvik, and Oslo passes through Siljan.

== General information ==
=== Administrative history ===
The formannskapsdistrikt law of 1837 created a system of local government in Norway by establishing each town (ladested or kjøpstad) and each Church of Norway prestegjeld as a civil municipality. On 1 January 1838, Slemdal prestegjeld was established as Slemdal Municipality (later re-named Siljan).

During the 1960s, there were many municipal mergers across Norway due to the work of the Schei Committee. On 1 January 1964, a small area (population: 16) of Hedrum Municipality in Vestfold county was transferred to Siljan Municipality in Telemark county. Again on 1 January 1968, the unpopulated Svartangen area was transferred from Hedrum Municipality to Siljan Municipality.

In 2020, there were many municipal and county mergers across Norway due to the work of the Solberg cabinet. Historically, this municipality was part of Telemark county. On 1 January 2020, the municipality became a part of the newly-formed Vestfold og Telemark county (after Telemark and Vestfold counties were merged). The merger was shortlived, and on 1 January 2024, the merger was undone and this municipality became part of Telemark county once again.

=== Name ===
The municipality is named after the old Slemdal prestegjeld. The prestegjeld was after the local Slemdal valley (Old Norse: Sleimdalr). The first element is likely the old name of a river, the meaning of which is uncertain. The last element is dalr which means "valley" or "dale".

On 3 November 1917, a royal resolution changed the name of the municipality to Siljan. This name comes from the old Siljan farm (Old Norse: Seljur) since the first Siljan Church was built there. The name's meaning is uncertain, but it is likely that it comes from the plura form of selja which means "sallow tree" or "willow".

=== Coat of arms ===
The coat of arms was granted on 16 June 1989. The official blazon is "Vert, three saw blades argent palewise in fess" (Norwegian: I grønt tre opprette sølv sagblad). This means the arms have a green field (background) and the charge is a set of three saw blades standing vertically in a horizontal row. The charge has a tincture of argent which means it is commonly colored white, but if it is made out of metal, then silver is used. The green color in the field and the saw blade design symbolize the importance of the timber industry in Siljan. This type of saw blade was used locally throughout history. There were many saw mills located in Siljan along its waterways. The arms were designed by Halvor Holtskog, Jr. The municipal flag has the same design as the coat of arms.

=== Churches ===
The Church of Norway has one parish (sokn) within Siljan Municipality. It is part of the Skien prosti (deanery) in the Diocese of Agder og Telemark.

Churches in Siljan Municipality
| Parish (sokn) | Church name | Location of the church | Year built |
|---|---|---|---|
| Siljan | Siljan Church | Snurråsen | c. 1200 |

== Geography ==
The highest point in the municipality is the 649.25-metre (2,130.1 ft) tall mountain Nordre Bølene, located on the border with Skien Municipality. Kongsberg Municipality (in Buskerud county) is located to the north, Larvik Municipality (in Vestfold county) is located to the east, Porsgrunn Municipality is located to the south, and Skien Municipality is located to the west.

== Government ==
Siljan Municipality is responsible for primary education (through 10th grade), outpatient health services, senior citizen services, welfare and other social services, zoning, economic development, and municipal roads and utilities. The municipality is governed by a municipal council of directly elected representatives. The mayor is indirectly elected by a vote of the municipal council. The municipality is under the jurisdiction of the Nedre Telemark District Court and the Agder Court of Appeal.

=== Municipal council ===
The municipal council (Kommunestyre) of Siljan Municipality is made up of 17 representatives that are elected to four year terms. The tables below show the current and historical composition of the council by political party.

Siljan kommunestyre 2023–2027
| Party name (in Norwegian) | Number of representatives |
|---|---|
| Labour Party (Arbeiderpartiet) | 5 |
| Conservative Party (Høyre) | 5 |
| Christian Democratic Party (Kristelig Folkeparti) | 1 |
| Centre Party (Senterpartiet) | 4 |
| Socialist Left Party (Sosialistisk Venstreparti) | 2 |
| Total number of members: | 17 |

Siljan kommunestyre 2019–2023
| Party name (in Norwegian) | Number of representatives |
|---|---|
| Labour Party (Arbeiderpartiet) | 6 |
| Conservative Party (Høyre) | 2 |
| Christian Democratic Party (Kristelig Folkeparti) | 1 |
| Centre Party (Senterpartiet) | 7 |
| Socialist Left Party (Sosialistisk Venstreparti) | 1 |
| Total number of members: | 17 |

Siljan kommunestyre 2015–2019
| Party name (in Norwegian) | Number of representatives |
|---|---|
| Labour Party (Arbeiderpartiet) | 6 |
| Conservative Party (Høyre) | 2 |
| Christian Democratic Party (Kristelig Folkeparti) | 1 |
| Centre Party (Senterpartiet) | 7 |
| Socialist Left Party (Sosialistisk Venstreparti) | 1 |
| Total number of members: | 17 |

Siljan kommunestyre 2011–2015
| Party name (in Norwegian) | Number of representatives |
|---|---|
| Labour Party (Arbeiderpartiet) | 10 |
| Centre Party (Senterpartiet) | 2 |
| Socialist Left Party (Sosialistisk Venstreparti) | 1 |
| Joint list of the Conservative Party (Høyre) and Christian Democratic Party (Kristelig Folkeparti) | 4 |
| Total number of members: | 17 |

Siljan kommunestyre 2007–2011
| Party name (in Norwegian) | Number of representatives |
|---|---|
| Labour Party (Arbeiderpartiet) | 8 |
| Centre Party (Senterpartiet) | 2 |
| Socialist Left Party (Sosialistisk Venstreparti) | 1 |
| Joint list of the Conservative Party (Høyre), Christian Democratic Party (Kristelig Folkeparti), and Liberal Party (Venstre) | 6 |
| Total number of members: | 17 |

Siljan kommunestyre 2003–2007
| Party name (in Norwegian) | Number of representatives |
|---|---|
| Labour Party (Arbeiderpartiet) | 10 |
| Conservative Party (Høyre) | 1 |
| Christian Democratic Party (Kristelig Folkeparti) | 2 |
| Centre Party (Senterpartiet) | 1 |
| Socialist Left Party (Sosialistisk Venstreparti) | 2 |
| Liberal Party (Venstre) | 1 |
| Total number of members: | 17 |

Siljan kommunestyre 1999–2003
| Party name (in Norwegian) | Number of representatives |
|---|---|
| Labour Party (Arbeiderpartiet) | 9 |
| Socialist Left Party (Sosialistisk Venstreparti) | 1 |
| Liberal Party (Venstre) | 1 |
| Joint list of the Conservative Party (Høyre), Christian Democratic Party (Kristelig Folkeparti), and Centre Party (Senterpartiet) | 6 |
| Total number of members: | 17 |

Siljan kommunestyre 1995–1999
| Party name (in Norwegian) | Number of representatives |
|---|---|
| Labour Party (Arbeiderpartiet) | 9 |
| Conservative Party (Høyre) | 2 |
| Christian Democratic Party (Kristelig Folkeparti) | 3 |
| Centre Party (Senterpartiet) | 2 |
| Socialist Left Party (Sosialistisk Venstreparti) | 1 |
| Total number of members: | 17 |

Siljan kommunestyre 1991–1995
| Party name (in Norwegian) | Number of representatives |
|---|---|
| Labour Party (Arbeiderpartiet) | 7 |
| Socialist Left Party (Sosialistisk Venstreparti) | 2 |
| Joint list of the Conservative Party (Høyre), Christian Democratic Party (Kristelig Folkeparti), and Centre Party (Senterpartiet) | 8 |
| Total number of members: | 17 |

Siljan kommunestyre 1987–1991
| Party name (in Norwegian) | Number of representatives |
|---|---|
| Labour Party (Arbeiderpartiet) | 8 |
| Joint list of the Conservative Party (Høyre), Christian Democratic Party (Kristelig Folkeparti), Centre Party (Senterpartiet), and Liberal Party (Venstre) | 9 |
| Total number of members: | 17 |

Siljan kommunestyre 1983–1987
| Party name (in Norwegian) | Number of representatives |
|---|---|
| Labour Party (Arbeiderpartiet) | 11 |
| Conservative Party (Høyre) | 2 |
| Christian Democratic Party (Kristelig Folkeparti) | 2 |
| Centre Party (Senterpartiet) | 2 |
| Total number of members: | 17 |

Siljan kommunestyre 1979–1983
| Party name (in Norwegian) | Number of representatives |
|---|---|
| Labour Party (Arbeiderpartiet) | 8 |
| Christian Democratic Party (Kristelig Folkeparti) | 3 |
| Joint list of the Conservative Party (Høyre), Centre Party (Senterpartiet), and Liberal Party (Venstre) | 6 |
| Total number of members: | 17 |

Siljan kommunestyre 1975–1979
| Party name (in Norwegian) | Number of representatives |
|---|---|
| Labour Party (Arbeiderpartiet) | 8 |
| Christian Democratic Party (Kristelig Folkeparti) | 3 |
| Joint list of the Conservative Party (Høyre), Centre Party (Senterpartiet), and Liberal Party (Venstre) | 6 |
| Total number of members: | 17 |

Siljan kommunestyre 1971–1975
| Party name (in Norwegian) | Number of representatives |
|---|---|
| Labour Party (Arbeiderpartiet) | 10 |
| Christian Democratic Party (Kristelig Folkeparti) | 3 |
| Centre Party (Senterpartiet) | 2 |
| Liberal Party (Venstre) | 2 |
| Total number of members: | 17 |

Siljan kommunestyre 1967–1971
| Party name (in Norwegian) | Number of representatives |
|---|---|
| Labour Party (Arbeiderpartiet) | 9 |
| Christian Democratic Party (Kristelig Folkeparti) | 3 |
| Centre Party (Senterpartiet) | 3 |
| Liberal Party (Venstre) | 2 |
| Total number of members: | 17 |

Siljan kommunestyre 1963–1967
| Party name (in Norwegian) | Number of representatives |
|---|---|
| Labour Party (Arbeiderpartiet) | 11 |
| Christian Democratic Party (Kristelig Folkeparti) | 3 |
| Centre Party (Senterpartiet) | 2 |
| Liberal Party (Venstre) | 1 |
| Total number of members: | 17 |

Siljan herredsstyre 1959–1963
| Party name (in Norwegian) | Number of representatives |
|---|---|
| Labour Party (Arbeiderpartiet) | 9 |
| Christian Democratic Party (Kristelig Folkeparti) | 4 |
| Centre Party (Senterpartiet) | 3 |
| Liberal Party (Venstre) | 1 |
| Total number of members: | 17 |

Siljan herredsstyre 1955–1959
| Party name (in Norwegian) | Number of representatives |
|---|---|
| Labour Party (Arbeiderpartiet) | 8 |
| Christian Democratic Party (Kristelig Folkeparti) | 4 |
| Joint List(s) of Non-Socialist Parties (Borgerlige Felleslister) | 5 |
| Total number of members: | 17 |

Siljan herredsstyre 1951–1955
| Party name (in Norwegian) | Number of representatives |
|---|---|
| Labour Party (Arbeiderpartiet) | 9 |
| Christian Democratic Party (Kristelig Folkeparti) | 3 |
| Farmers' Party (Bondepartiet) | 3 |
| Liberal Party (Venstre) | 1 |
| Total number of members: | 16 |

Siljan herredsstyre 1947–1951
| Party name (in Norwegian) | Number of representatives |
|---|---|
| Labour Party (Arbeiderpartiet) | 7 |
| Christian Democratic Party (Kristelig Folkeparti) | 5 |
| Farmers' Party (Bondepartiet) | 3 |
| Liberal Party (Venstre) | 1 |
| Total number of members: | 16 |

Siljan herredsstyre 1945–1947
| Party name (in Norwegian) | Number of representatives |
|---|---|
| Labour Party (Arbeiderpartiet) | 7 |
| Christian Democratic Party (Kristelig Folkeparti) | 5 |
| Farmers' Party (Bondepartiet) | 1 |
| Liberal Party (Venstre) | 3 |
| Total number of members: | 16 |

Siljan herredsstyre 1937–1940*
| Party name (in Norwegian) | Number of representatives |
|---|---|
| Labour Party (Arbeiderpartiet) | 6 |
| Liberal Party (Venstre) | 7 |
| Joint List(s) of Non-Socialist Parties (Borgerlige Felleslister) | 3 |
| Total number of members: | 16 |
Note: Due to the German occupation of Norway during World War II, no elections were held for new municipal councils until after the war ended in 1945.

=== Mayors ===
The mayor (Norwegian: ordfører) of Siljan Municipality is the political leader of the municipality and the chairperson of the municipal council. The following people have held this position:

- 1838–1841: Erik J. Tvedten
- 1842–1843: Niels Andersen Kiste
- 1844–1848: Ole Larsen Augestad
- 1849–1851: Knut D. Røed
- 1852–1894: Arne Pedersen Kiste
- 1895–1895: Lars Knudsen Høisæth
- 1896–1901: Peter S. Øvrebø (V)
- 1902–1906: unknown
- 1907–1910: Ole J. Rød (V)
- 1910–1913: Ivar Moe
- 1913–1925: Ole J. Rød (V/Bp)
- 1925–1928: Karl Forberg (V)
- 1929–1931: Nils Austad (V)
- 1931–1934: Knut Engelstad (V)
- 1934–1942: Lars R. Nesje (V)
- 1942–1945: Karl Sokka (NS)
- 1945–1947: Lars R. Nesje (V)
- 1947–1951: Karl Forberg (KrF)
- 1951–1955: Kristian Norheim (Ap)
- 1955–1959: Jon Lunde (KrF)
- 1959–1967: Hallvard Nygård (Ap)
- 1967–1971: Thor Austad (Ap)
- 1971–1975: Hallvard Nygård (Ap)
- 1975–1979: Bernt Johannesen (LL)
- 1979–1983: Bjørn Helge Sogn (LL)
- 1983–1987: Ole Kittilsen (Ap)
- 1987–1991: Olav Torsholt (Ap)
- 1991–2007: Finn Tallakstad (Ap)
- 2007–2011: Ole Kristian Holtan (Ap)
- 2011–2015: Gunn Berit Rygg Holmelid (Ap)
- 2015–2023: Kjell Abraham Sølverød (Sp)
- 2023–present: Elisabeth Hammer (KrF)

== Notable people ==
- Kristian Norheim (born 1976), a Norwegian politician who was a municipal councillor in Siljan from 1995 to 1999
