= Terje Riis-Johansen =

Norwegian politician (born 1968)

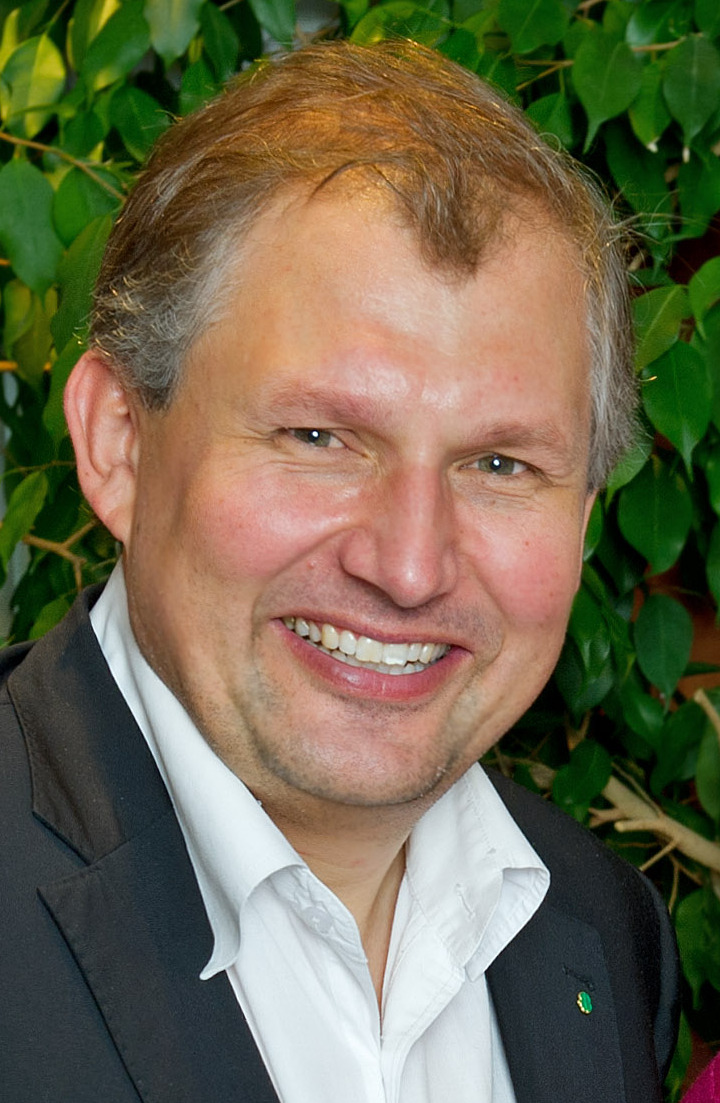

County Mayor of Vestfold og Telemark
- In office 1 January 2020 – 31 December 2023 (Note: Although Telemark and Vestfold did not separate before 31 December 2023, the county council was split before the separation of the counties. Riis-Johansen was thus succeeded by Anne Strømøy in Vestfold on 18 October 2023, followed by Sven Tore Løkslid in Telemark on 23 October 2023. Riis-Johansen served a ceremonial role with no effective power from 23 October till 31 December 2023.)
- Deputy: Sven Tore Løkslid; Maja Foss Five
- Preceded by: Office established Rune Hogsnes (Vestfold); Sven Tore Løkslid (Telemark)
- Succeeded by: Office disestablished Anne Strømøy (Vestfold); Sven Tore Løkslid (Telemark)

County Mayor of Telemark
- In office 5 October 2011 – 13 October 2015
- Preceded by: Gunn Marit Helgesen
- Succeeded by: Sven Tore Løkslid

Minister of Petroleum and Energy
- In office 20 June 2008 – 4 March 2011
- Prime Minister: Jens Stoltenberg
- Preceded by: Åslaug Haga
- Succeeded by: Ola Borten Moe

Minister of Agriculture and Food
- In office 17 October 2005 – 20 June 2008
- Prime Minister: Jens Stoltenberg
- Preceded by: Lars Sponheim
- Succeeded by: Lars Peder Brekk

Member of the Norwegian Parliament
- In office 1 October 1993 – 30 September 1997
- Constituency: Telemark

Personal details
- Born: 15 March 1968 (age 58) Skien, Norway
- Party: Centre Party

Terje Riis-Johansen (born 15 March 1968) is a Norwegian politician for the Centre Party.

Riis-Johansen was born in Skien. He was elected to the Norwegian Parliament from Telemark in 1993, but was not re-elected in 1997. From 1997 to 1999, during the first cabinet Bondevik, he was appointed political advisor in the Ministry of Finance. In 2005, during the second cabinet Stoltenberg, he was appointed Minister of Agriculture and Food, but changed department in 2008 and served as Minister of Petroleum and Energy. On 4 March 2011 he was succeeded by fellow Centre Party politician Ola Borten Moe.

On the local level he was a member of Skien municipality council from 1991 to 1995. During the same term he was also a member of Telemark county council.

After the 2011 Norwegian local elections the local centre-right alliance was dissolved, and Riis-Johansen became Telemark's county mayor of a new centre-left coalition.

Riis-Johansen was a member of the board of Nei til EU from 1995 to 1997, of Telemark University College from 2000 to 2003 and of the Norwegian Farmers' Union from 2000 to 2005.

Riis-Johansen served as the only county mayor of Vestfold og Telemark between 2020 and 2023, when the county was split into the new and re-established counties of Telemark and Vestfold. He was succeeded by Anne Strømøy in Vestfold on 18 October 2023, followed by Sven Tore Løkslid in Telemark on 23 October 2023.

He became deputy county mayor of Telemark under Løkslid, holding the position until he took over as county mayor temporarily following Løkslid's resignation in August 2026, and was confirmed by the county council to continue permanently the next month.

== Notes ==
Political offices
Preceded by Lars Sponheim	Norwegian Minister of Agriculture and Food; 2005–2008	Succeeded by Lars Peder Brekk
Preceded by Åslaug Haga	Norwegian Minister of Petroleum and Energy; 2008–2011	Succeeded by Ola Borten Moe
Preceded by Gunn Marit Helgesen	County mayor of Telemark; 2011–2015	Succeeded by Sven Tore Løkslid
