= Siljan (village) =

Village in Siljan Municipality, Norway

- Village
- Interactive map of Siljan
- Coordinates: 59.2878°N 9.70625°E
- Country: Norway
- Region: Eastern Norway
- County: Telemark
- District: Grenland
- Municipality: Siljan Municipality

Area
  - Total: 0.79 km^{2} (0.31 sq mi)
- Elevation: 100 m (330 ft)

Population (2025)
  - Total: 1,058
  - Density: 1,339/km^{2} (3,470/sq mi)
- Time zone: UTC+01:00 (CET)
  - Summer (DST): UTC+02:00 (CEST)
- Post Code: 3748 Siljan

Siljan is the administrative centre of Siljan Municipality in Telemark county, Norway. The village is located about 2 kilometres (1.2 mi) to the south of the village of Snurråsen and about 10 kilometres (6.2 mi) to the northeast of the town of Skien.

The 0.79-square-kilometre (200-acre) village has a population (2025) of 1,058 and a population density of 1,339 inhabitants per square kilometre (3,470/sq mi).
