= Vestfold og Telemark =

County of Norway (2020–2024)

Vestfold og Telemark County Vestfold og Telemark fylke
- Former County
- Flag Coat of arms

- Location within Vestfold og Telemark Location within Norway
- Coordinates: 59°30′N 9°00′E
- Country: Norway
- County: Vestfold og Telemark
- District: Eastern Norway
- Established: 1 January 2020
  - Preceded by: Telemark; Vestfold
- Disestablished: 31 December 2023
  - Succeeded by: Telemark; Vestfold
- Administrative centre: Skien (county municipality); Tønsberg (county municipality offices and governor)

Government
  - Body: Vestfold og Telemark County Municipality
  - Governor (2022): Fred-Ivar Syrstad (acting)
  - County mayor (2020): Terje Riis-Johansen (Sp)

Area (upon dissolution)
  - Total: 17,466 km^{2} (6,744 sq mi)
  - Land: 15,925 km^{2} (6,149 sq mi)
  - Water: 1,541 km^{2} (595 sq mi) 8.8%
  - Rank: #7 in Norway

Population (2021)
  - Total: 421,882
  - Rank: #6 in Norway
  - Density: 26.5/km^{2} (69/sq mi)
  - Change (10 years): ▲ +6.4%
- Demonym(s): Vestfolding, Telemarking, or Teledøl

Official language
  - Norwegian form: Neutral
- Time zone: UTC+01:00 (CET)
  - Summer (DST): UTC+02:00 (CEST)
- ISO 3166 code: NO-38
- Website: Official website

Vestfold og Telemark (Urban East Norwegian: [ˈvɛ̂stfɔɫ ɔ ˈtêːləmɑrk]; lit. 'Vestfold and Telemark') was a county in Norway, which existed from 1 January 2020 to 31 December 2023. The county was the southernmost one of Eastern Norway and consisted of two distinct and separate traditional regions: the former counties of Telemark and (most of) Vestfold. The capital was located in the town of Skien, which was also the county's largest city. While Skien was the seat of the county municipality, the seat of the County Governor was Tønsberg. It bordered the counties of Viken, Vestland, Rogaland and Agder until its dissolution.

Telemark voted against the merger, on the basis that the regions have nothing in common and do not constitute a natural geographical, cultural, social or political entity. Regardless, the Storting voted on 7 January 2018 to merge the counties by force, and the merger took effect on 1 January 2020. Unlike Telemark or Vestfold, it does not form a traditional or cultural region, but is instead administrative.

On 15 February 2022, the county council decided to vote for the future of Vestfold og Telemark county as it was reported that politicians did not co-operate well across the former county borders. With 42 votes against 19, the county council voted for a separation of the county into its former counties of Telemark and Vestfold. Representatives to the respective county councils were elected in the 2023 local elections and the old counties was to be re-established on 1 January 2024.

On 31 December 2023, the county ceased to exist. The new counties of Telemark and Vestfold were re-established on 1 January 2024.

== Coat of arms ==
Coat of arms shows a gold-colored Viking ship and acanthus on a red background.

It combines Vestfold's three Viking ship finds - here represented by the Klåstad ship - with Telemark's rich traditions of rose painting and wood carving. The coat of arms was adopted by the county councils on 6 December 2018 and was put into use from 1 January 2020. When Vestfold and Telemark counties were dissolved from 1 January 2024, the county coat of arms went out of use.

== History ==
The region of Vestfold and Telemark consists of the two former counties of Telemark and Vestfold, whose administrative histories are separate.

Telemark County was established in 1919 as a continuation of the former Bratsberg amt, which had been a len and amt since the union with Denmark. Bratsberg amt and the later Telemark county consist of several partly overlapping historic districts. The name Telemark itself did not originally cover the coasts, and the minority at the Storting therefore proposed the name Grenland-Telemark when the modern county was established.

Vestfold County was established in 1919 as a continuation of the former Jarlsberg and Larviks amt. The latter was established in 1821 when the counties of Laurvig and Jarlsberg were dissolved and merged into a common county.

=== The merging process ===
A possible merger of the counties has been discussed for several years with different constellations. Telemark County Council voted in April 2017 against a merge with Vestfold. Vestfold County Council voted for a merge with both Telemark and Buskerud. The Storting decided a merger of Telemark and Vestfold on 8 June 2017 with effect from 1 January 2020.

The Language Council of Norway recommended the name Telemark og Vestfold as the name for the new county. However, Telemark County Council decided that the name Telemark under any circumstances had to be included in the new name, while Vestfold County Council suggested the name of Vest-Viken, which was criticized because the name was originally created by the Nazi Quisling regime during World War 2. The name Vest-Viken was in use when the Reichskommissariat administration merged the separate counties of Vestfold and Buskerud into a single administrative unit. It was also unfavoured because Telemark is mostly located outside the historical Viken area; at best the small coastal area of the county may be included in the periphery of Viken. Media in Norway, such as the state broadcaster NRK, mocked the proposal Vest-Viken as a "Nazi name".

On 10 November 2017, Vestfold withdrew the proposal of Vest-Viken and it became apparent that both counties supported the Language Council's proposal on Telemark and Vestfold. Eventually the local politicians agreed on Vestfold og Telemark as a compromise, although Telemark politicians stated that Telemark should be the first part of the name, both for alphabetical reasons and because of the Telemark name's iconic status in Norway and internationally, a status that the Vestfold name lacks. As of 2018, Telemark og Vestfold is already the name of the relevant branches of several government agencies, and both name forms are widely used.

As Vestfold was forcibly merged with Telemark, Svelvik Municipality decided to vote for a merger with Drammen Municipality, which would lead Svelvik to leave Vestfold county and join the new county of Viken on 1 January 2020. The vote turned in favor for merging with Drammen municipality, along with Nedre Eiker Municipality.

== Municipalities ==
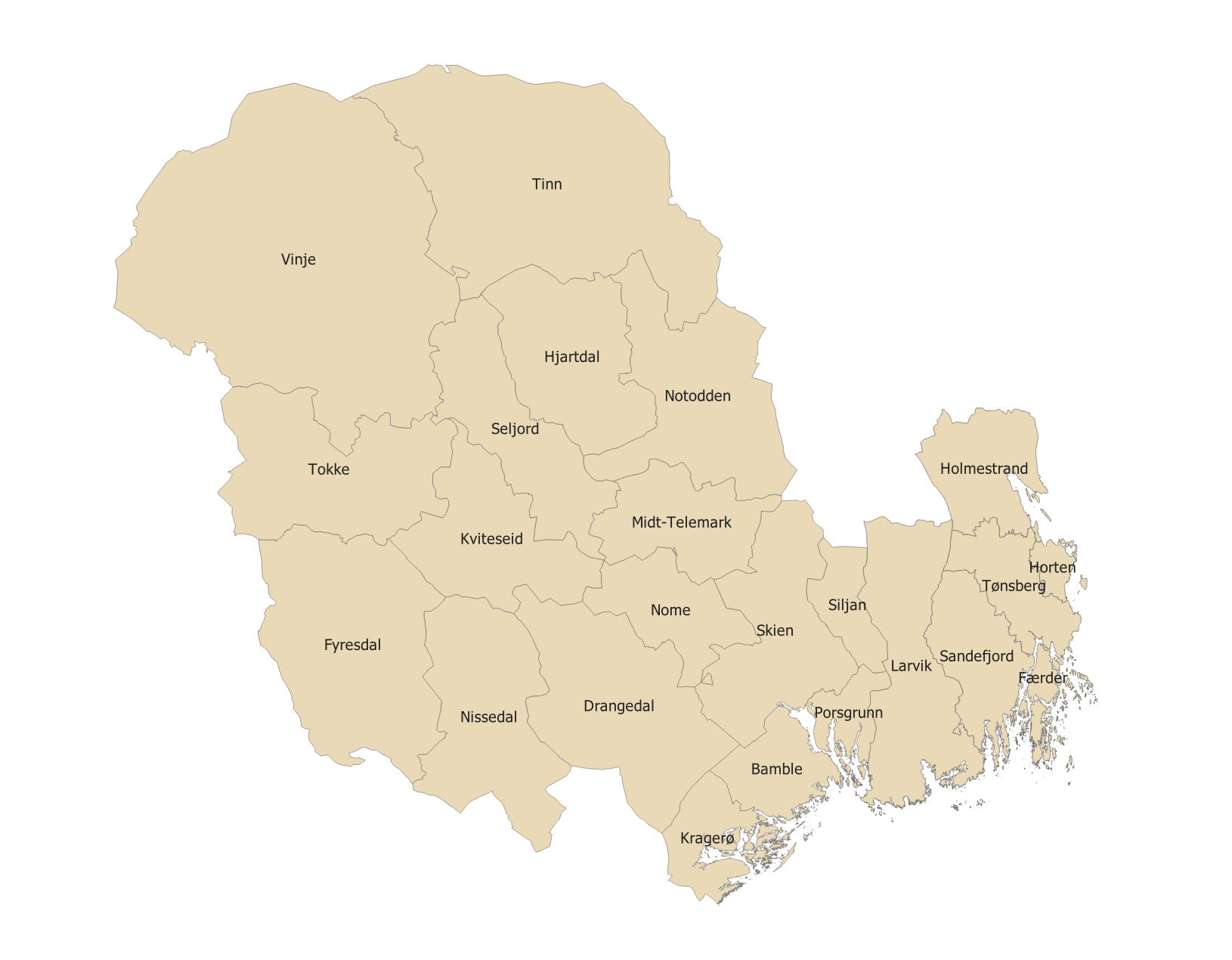
Municipalities in Vestfold og Telemark as of 1 January 2020

=== Vestfold og Telemark ===
Vestfold og Telemark County has a total of 23 municipalities:

No.	Municipality No.	Name	Former Municipality No.	Former County
1	3801	Horten Municipality	0701 Horten	Vestfold
2	3802	Holmestrand Municipality	0715 Holmestrand (including Sande and Hof)	Vestfold
3	3803	Tønsberg Municipality	0704 Tønsberg (including 0716 Re)	Vestfold
4	3804	Sandefjord Municipality	0710 Sandefjord (including Andebu and Stokke)	Vestfold
5	3805	Larvik Municipality	0712 Larvik (including Lardal)	Vestfold
6	3806	Porsgrunn Municipality	0805 Porsgrunn	Telemark
7	3807	Skien Municipality	0806 Skien	Telemark
8	3808	Notodden Municipality	0807 Notodden	Telemark
9	3811	Færder Municipality	Merger of Nøtterøy and Tjøme	Vestfold
10	3812	Siljan Municipality	0811 Siljan	Telemark
11	3813	Bamble Municipality	0814 Bamble	Telemark
12	3814	Kragerø Municipality	0815 Kragerø	Telemark
13	3815	Drangedal Municipality	0817 Drangedal	Telemark
14	3816	Nome Municipality	0819 Nome	Telemark
15	3817	Midt-Telemark Municipality	Merger of 0821 Bø and 0822 Sauherad	Telemark
16	3818	Tinn Municipality	0826 Tinn	Telemark
17	3819	Hjartdal Municipality	0827 Hjartdal	Telemark
18	3820	Seljord Municipality	0828 Seljord	Telemark
19	3821	Kviteseid Municipality	0829 Kviteseid	Telemark
20	3822	Nissedal Municipality	0830 Nissedal	Telemark
21	3823	Fyresdal Municipality	0831 Fyresdal	Telemark
22	3824	Tokke Municipality	0833 Tokke	Telemark
23	3825	Vinje Municipality	0834 Vinje	Telemark

== Urban areas ==
The largest urban areas of Vestfold og Telemark, sorted after population (municipalities in parentheses):

- Porsgrunn/Skien - 92 753 (Bamble Municipality, Porsgrunn Municipality, Skien Municipality) This also includes the towns of Brevik, Langesund, Porsgrunn, Skien and Stathelle.
- Tønsberg - 56 293 (Færder Municipality and Tønsberg Municipality)
- Sandefjord - 43 595 (Sandefjord Municipality)
- Larvik - 24 208 (Larvik Municipality)
- Horten - 20 371 (Horten Municipality)
- Notodden - 9 077 (Notodden Municipality)
- Holmestrand - 7 262 (Holmestrand Municipality)
- Stavern - 5 628 (Larvik Municipality)
- Kragerø - 5 445 (Kragerø Municipality)
- Vear - 3 642 (Sandefjord Municipality and Tønsberg Municipality)
- Stokke - 3 631 (Sandefjord Municipality)
- Bø - 3 285 (Midt-Telemark Municipality)
- Rjukan - 3 247 (Tinn Municipality)
- Åsgårdstrand - 3 091 (Horten Municipality and Tønsberg Municipality)
- Tjøme - 2 945 (Færder Municipality)
- Selvik - 2 685 (Holmestrand Municipality)
- Sem - 2 481 (Sandefjord Municipality and Tønsberg Municipality)
- Revetal/Bergsåsen - 2 403 (Tønsberg Municipality)
- Ulefoss - 2 275 (Nome Municipality)
- Sande - 2 254 (Holmestrand Municipality)
- Andebu - 2 207 (Sandefjord Municipality)
- Melsomvik - 2 113 (Sandefjord Municipality)
- Gullhaug - 2 038 (Holmestrand Municipality)

Brevik, Holmestrand, Horten, Kragerø, Langesund, Larvik, Notodden, Porsgrunn, Rjukan, Sandefjord, Skien, Stathelle, Stavern, Tønsberg and Åsgårdstrand all have town status.
