= Regional policy =

Policies to assist disadvantaged regions

Regional policy is the sum of a series of policies formulated according to regional differences to coordinate regional relations and regional macro operation mechanism, which affects regional development at the macro level. It includes regional economic policy, regional social policy, regional environmental policy, regional political policy, regional cultural policy, etc. Regional policy aims to improve economic conditions in regions of relative disadvantage, either within a nation or within a supranational grouping such as the European Union. Additionally, a regional policy may try to address high levels of unemployment and lower-than-average per capita incomes. Its main tool is public investment.

== Regional policy in the European Union ==
Although the European Union is one of the richest parts of the world, there are large internal disparities of income and opportunity between its regions. The May 2004 Enlargement, followed by accession of Bulgaria and Romania in January 2007, has widened these gaps. Regional policy transfers resources from richer to poorer regions.

“Regional policy targets all regions and cities in the European Union in to support job creation, business competitiveness, economic growth, sustainable development, and improve citizens’ quality of life.”

The argument for regional policy is that it is both an instrument of financial solidarity and a powerful force for economic integration.

=== Regional policy in Italy ===
The major Italian experience of regional policy is the Cassa per il Mezzogiorno, set up in the mid-1950s to foster economic development in southern Italy. Originally intended to last for six months, it survived until 1984.

New roads, irrigation projects and developments in infrastructure were built in an area where local communities had suffered seriously from poverty, de-population and high levels of emigration. Tourism projects attempted to exploit Calabria’s beaches.

=== Regional policy in the United Kingdom ===
UK regional policy was born during the economic depression of the 1930s, when heavy industries in the north were devastated. "Assisted Areas" were established, within which companies could acquire grants or capital allowances – known as Regional Selective Assistance (RSA) – in return for protecting jobs.

The overall pattern of policy changed little in the next forty years. Despite criticism by a 1970s Royal Commission that it was "Empiricism run mad; a game of hit and miss played with more enthusiasm than success", governments of both parties maintained Assisted Areas. Under the 1980s Thatcher government, regional policy was significantly rolled back, with Assisted Areas substantially reduced in size.

The post-1997 Labour administration reorganised regional policy, with RSA replaced by Selective Finance for Investment in England and Scotland. UK policy has been subject to EU regional policy framework, with its strong injunctions against unfair competition (generally meaning state aid).

== Regional policy in China ==
In China, regional policy is delivered through multi-level governance that involves central government, provinces, counties, townships and villages. The key role in regional policy and regional development plays The Department of Regional Economy under the Chinese National Development and Reform Commission (NDRC). The development of regional policy in China can be divided into three stages.

=== Balanced development in the early 30 years of New China (1949-1978) ===
The balanced development policy implemented in the early 30 years of the founding of the People's Republic of China is a process of the top-down one-way directive plan. The central government uses the national financial resources to implement major projects (infrastructure, national defense), carry out investment and construction, and adjust and control the layout of productivity. From the spatial level, it carries out strategic planning, guidance and control characterized by the unity of regional development. It established a number of industrial bases with initial scale, and laid the foundation for China's industrialization construction.

During China's Third Front construction, concerns of invasion by the Soviet Union or the United States prompted the development of infrastructure, industry, and specialized talent remote regions, ultimately laying a foundation for continued economic development in China's western regions even after the end of the initiative.It was distributed in the scattered mountainous areas, with the priority given to heavy industry, especially military industry. The development of light industry was insufficient, and there was a shortage of materials. In addition, the tendency of "attaching importance to the mainland but less to the coast" in the application of the balanced development policy has restrained the economic development.

After a Party Work Conference in May 1973 resolved to re-direct state investment efforts from the Third Front to the northeast and the coastal regions, the Third Front was no longer the country's most critical economic objective.

=== Unbalanced development in reform and opening up (1979-1998) ===
At the end of 1978, China began the historical process of reform and opening up, and profoundly summed up the lessons of the "Cultural Revolution" and the disadvantages of planned economy. During this period, unbalanced development was highly praised, which basically dominated the economic layout and regional development of China. In order to make some areas rich first, it encourages coastal cities and regions with low cost, quick effect, easy project landing and convenient foreign trade to develop first, and open up the riverside, belt and inland areas in stages, with emphasis and efficiency. Specific measures include establishment of special economic zones, economic and technological development zones and coastal port cities, etc.

=== Coordinated development since the new millennium (1999-) ===
At this stage, China implements the regional policy of "four plates" and "three support belts" as a whole, and promotes coordinated and complementary development among regions and narrow the regional economic gap under the guidance of major strategies. Specific measures include The Belt and Road Initiative, the development of the "Beijing Tianjin Hebei", the Yangtze River Economic Belt, the development of the Yangtze River economic belt, the construction of the Guangdong, Hong Kong and Macao.

After more than 20 years of reform and opening up, the unbalanced development strategy is oriented by "efficiency" and adopts the policy of inclining to the East, which promotes the rapid development of economic core areas such as the Pearl River Delta, the Yangtze River Delta and the Bohai rim, and economic growth poles such as Beijing, Shanghai, Shenzhen and Guangzhou.

During the 2000s, China's coastal areas continued to outpace its interior in economic development. The thinking of China's regional economic development has turned to the coordinated and balanced way of "maintaining the priority development momentum of the eastern region and accelerating the development of the central and western regions".

As regional disparities widened however, coastal areas became a major source of investment for inland areas.Manufacturing that was lower on the value chain trended towards moving inland. This trend was termed "industrial transfer." Developing Chinese policymakers reacted by further encouraging industrial transfer.

In the early 2000s, the government began to finance construction of cross-regional transportation to improve accessibility to, and develop of, China's interior regions. In March 2004, Premier Wen Jiabao announced The Rise of the Central Regions during his delivery of the Annual Report of the State Council. This initiative was added to the Politburo's agenda in 2006.

Western development and Northeast Revitalization are other main regional policy directions.

=== Specific Regional Policy ===
==== Special economic zone ====
In 1979, Deng Xiaoping first proposed the establishment of "export special zone". In 1990, the State Council approved the establishment of Shanghai Waigaoqiao Free Trade Zone, the first free trade zone in New China. In 2001, China joined the WTO to participate in international competition and cooperation. Since 2003, the State Council has issued a series of documents to build an energy-saving society. The development mode of low-carbon economy has become China's transformation of economic development mode and adjustment China (Shanghai) pilot Free Trade Zone, the first free trade zone in China, was officially established in 2013. The policy includes related keywords as bonded zone, western development, free trade zone, scientific and technological innovation, WTO entry, low-carbon economy, regional preferential policies, foreign direct investment.

==== Main functional areas ====
China's regional economy has formed an overall strategy of "four major plates" for the development of the west, the revitalization of the northeast, the rise of the central region and the first development of the East. The main functional areas are the implementation of the overall strategy of regional development. The land and space are divided into four categories: optimized development, key development, restricted development and prohibited development. The policy includes keywords such as coordinated development, cultivated land protection, the rise of Central China, industrial agglomeration, tax preference, public services, economic compensation, ecological compensation, revitalization of Northeast China, and circular economy.

==== One belt and one road ====
One belt and one road, Silk Road Economic Belt & 21st century maritime Silk Road, is a global development strategy adopted by the Chinese government in 2013 involving infrastructure development and investments in nearly 70 countries and international organizations in Asia, Europe, and Africa. It includes key words such as reform and opening up, regional cooperation, industrial upgrading, regional coordinated development, innovation drive, Yangtze River Delta, open economy.

== Regional policy in the United States ==
- Tennessee Valley Authority
- Department of Housing and Urban Development (HUD)

== See also ==
- Region
- Regional development
- Regional Studies Association
