= Nissedal =

Nissedal may refer to:

== Places ==
- Nissedal Municipality, a municipality in Telemark county, Norway
- Nissedal Church, a church in Nissedal Municipality in Telemark county, Norway
- Nissedal, or Kyrkjebygda, a village within Nissedal Municipality in Telemark county, Norway
- Nissedal prestegjeld, a former clerical district within the Church of Norway
