= Nissedal Church =

Church in Telemark, Norway

- Nissedal kyrkje
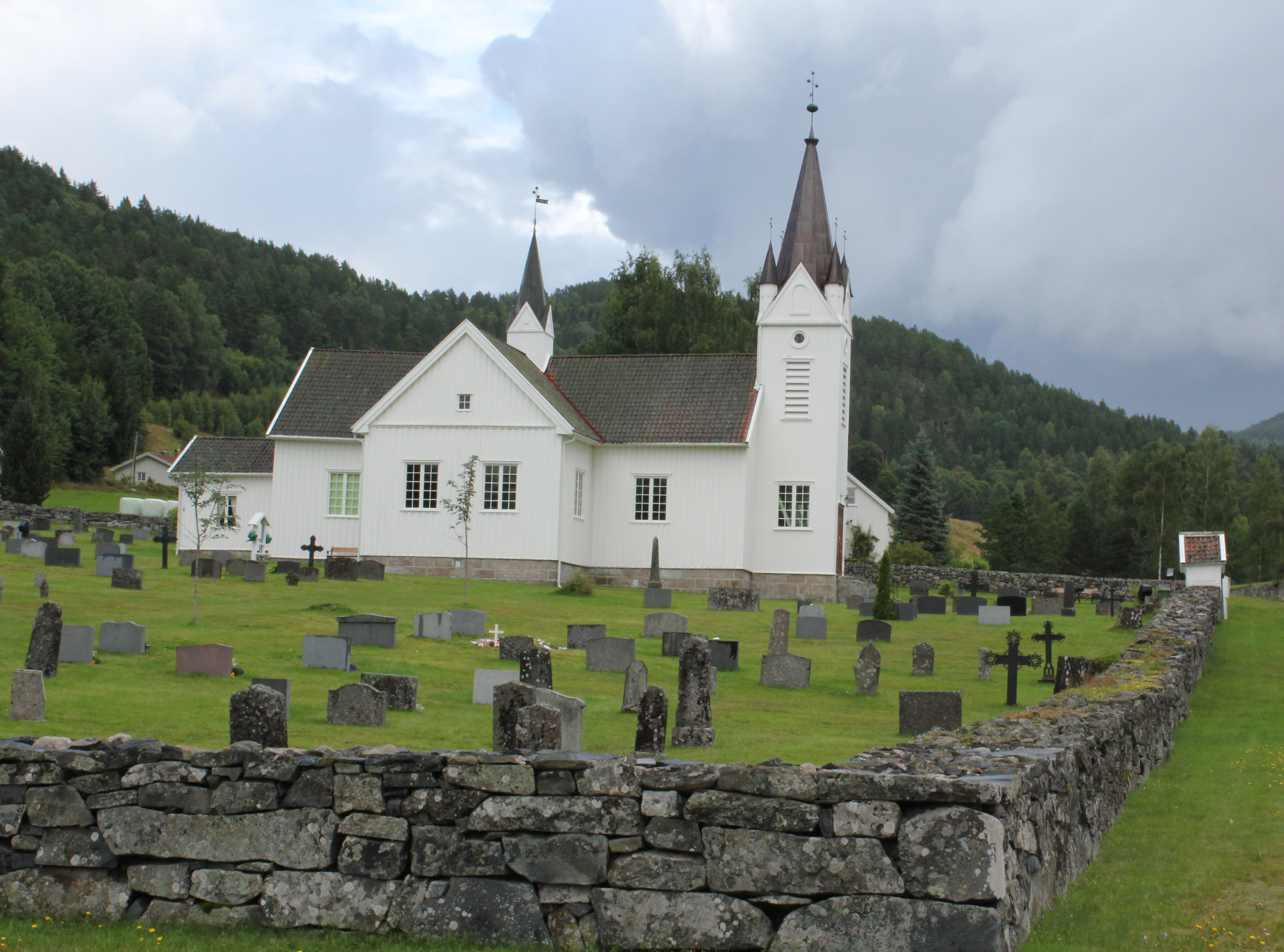
- View of the church
- Nissedal Church
- 59°09′43″N 8°30′21″E
- Location: Nissedal Municipality, Telemark
- Country: Norway
- Denomination: Church of Norway
- Previous denomination: Catholic Church
- Churchmanship: Evangelical Lutheran

History
- Status: Parish church
- Consecrated: 12 September 1764

Architecture
- Functional status: Active
- Architectural type: Cruciform
- Completed: 1764 (262 years ago)

Specifications
- Capacity: 270
- Materials: Wood

Administration
- Diocese: Agder og Telemark
- Deanery: Øvre Telemark prosti
- Parish: Nissedal
- Norwegian Cultural Heritage Site
- Type: Church
- Status: Automatically protected
- ID: 85135

Nissedal Church (Norwegian: Nissedal kyrkje) is a parish church of the Church of Norway in Nissedal Municipality in Telemark county, Norway. It is located in the village of Kyrkjebygda, on the east shore of the lake Nisser. It is one of the churches for the Nissedal parish which is part of the Øvre Telemark prosti (deanery) in the Diocese of Agder og Telemark. The white, wooden church was built in a cruciform design in 1764 using plans drawn up by an unknown architect. The church seats about 270 people.

== History ==
The earliest existing historical records of the church date back to the year 1441, but that was not when the church was built. The first church in Nissedal was a wooden stave church that was known as the Tveit Church. It may have been built during the 14th century. This church was auctioned off into private ownership during the great Norwegian church sale in 1723. At that time, the church was said to have had room for 250 people. By 1763, the church had become so dilapidated that the bishop ordered the owner to build a new church on the site. The old church was torn down in 1763 and work began on a new church right away. The new church was consecrated on 12 September 1764. The new building is a vaulted cruciform building with around 270 seats.

In 1814, this church served as an election church (Norwegian: valgkirke). Together with more than 300 other parish churches across Norway, it was a polling station for elections to the 1814 Norwegian Constituent Assembly which wrote the Constitution of Norway. This was Norway's first national elections. Each church parish was a constituency that elected people called "electors" who later met together in each county to elect the representatives for the assembly that was to meet at Eidsvoll Manor later that year.

In 1833, a sacristy was built as an extension off of the choir and a small roof tower was added for decoration, with a wind vane at the top. In 1854, the church building was purchased by the congregation, ending a period of 131 years of private ownership. In 1900, a new church porch with a bell tower was built at the entrance to the church. The church was restored in 1938 according to plans by Hans Paasche Thorne and Finn Krafft.

== Media gallery ==
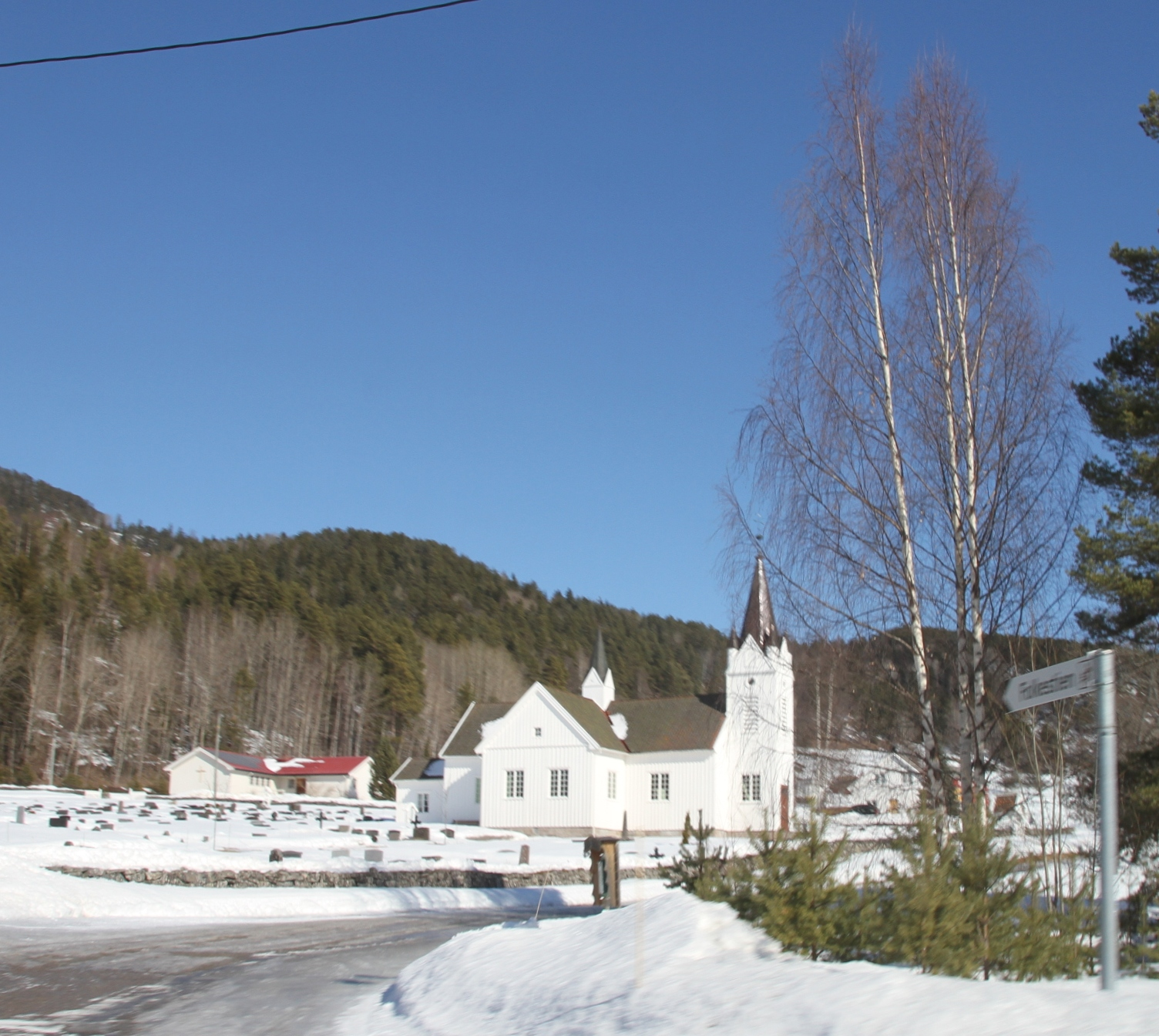

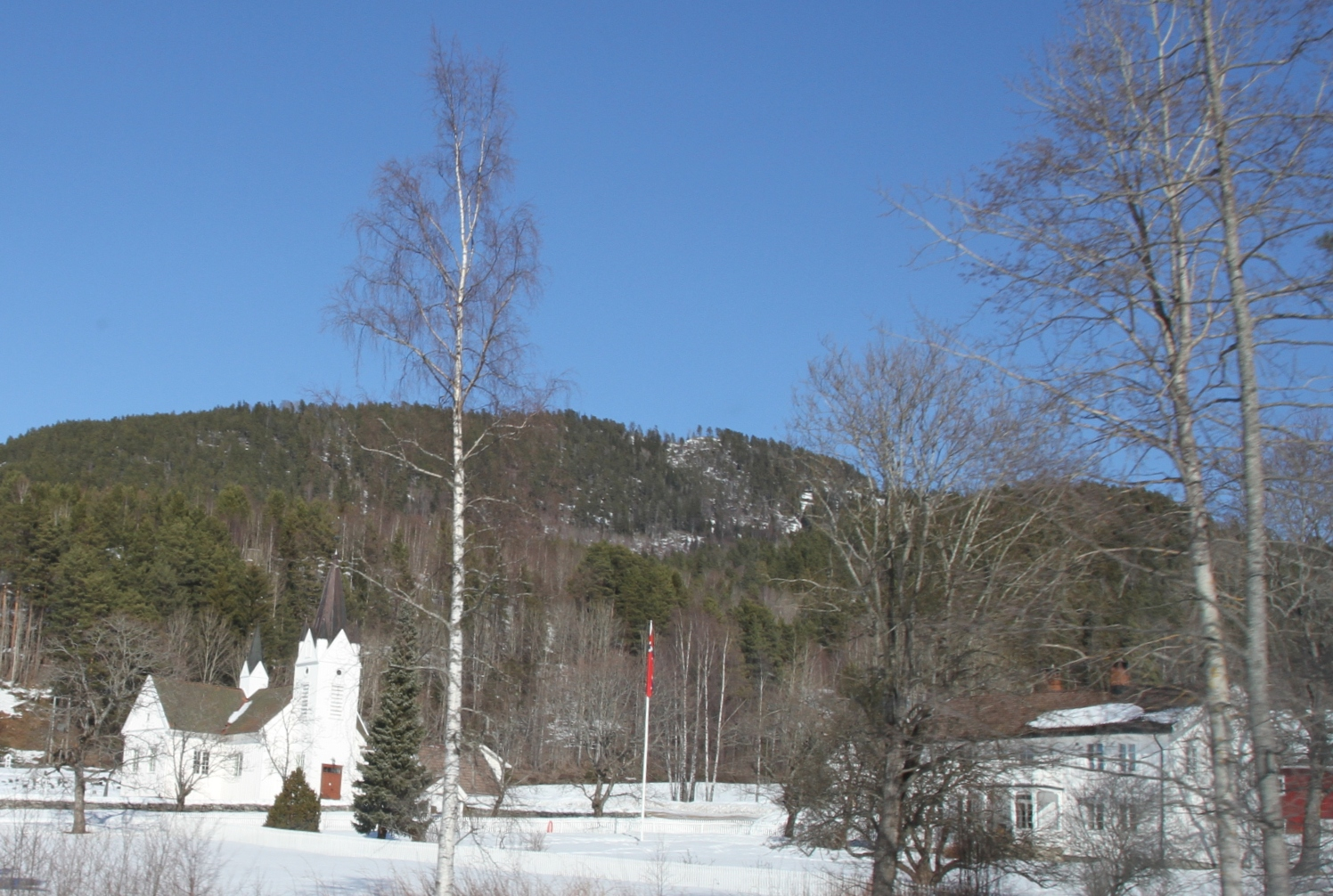

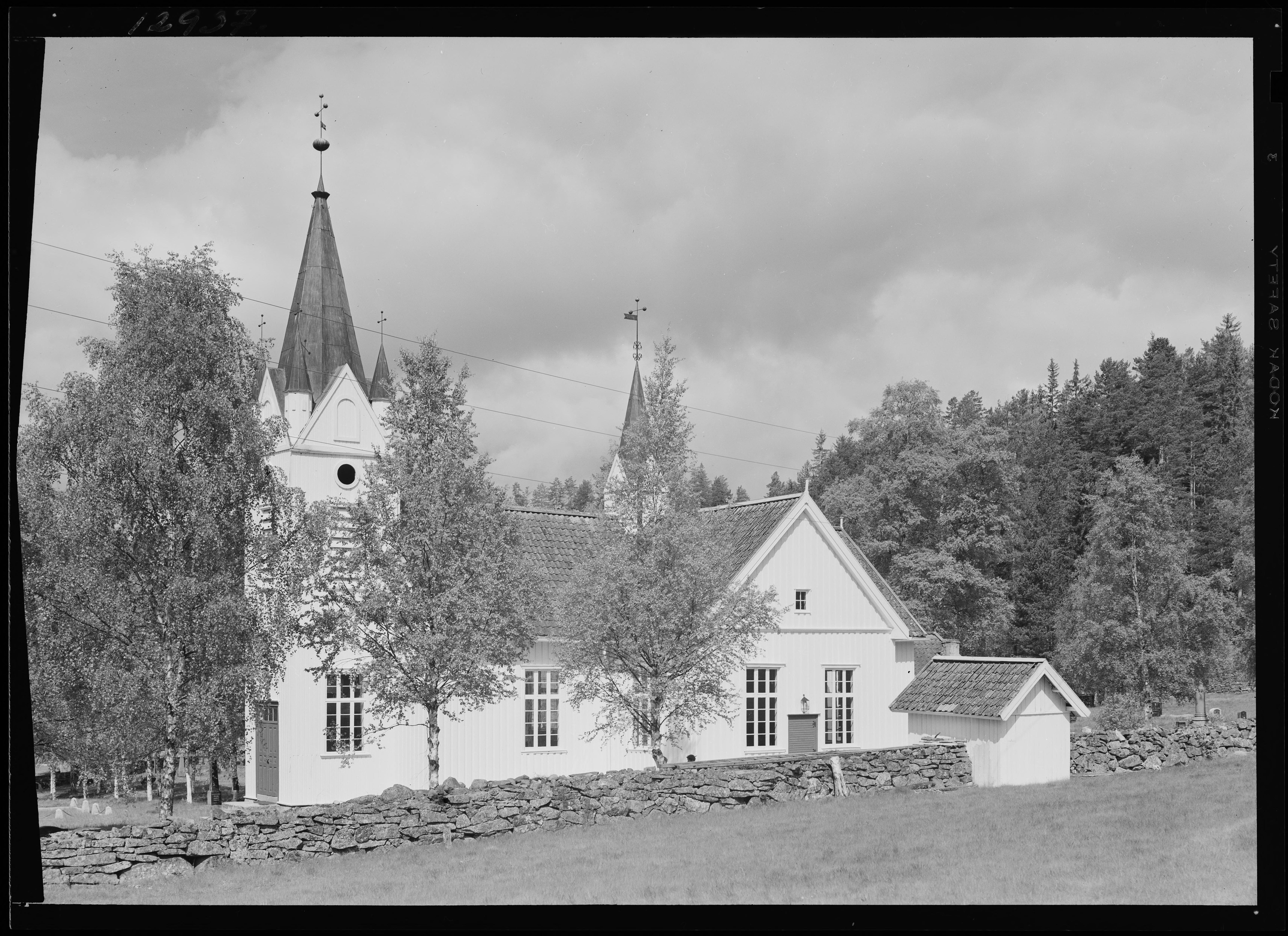

== See also ==
- List of churches in Agder og Telemark
