= Nissedal Municipality =

Municipality in Telemark, Norway

Nissedal Municipality Nissedal kommune
- Municipality
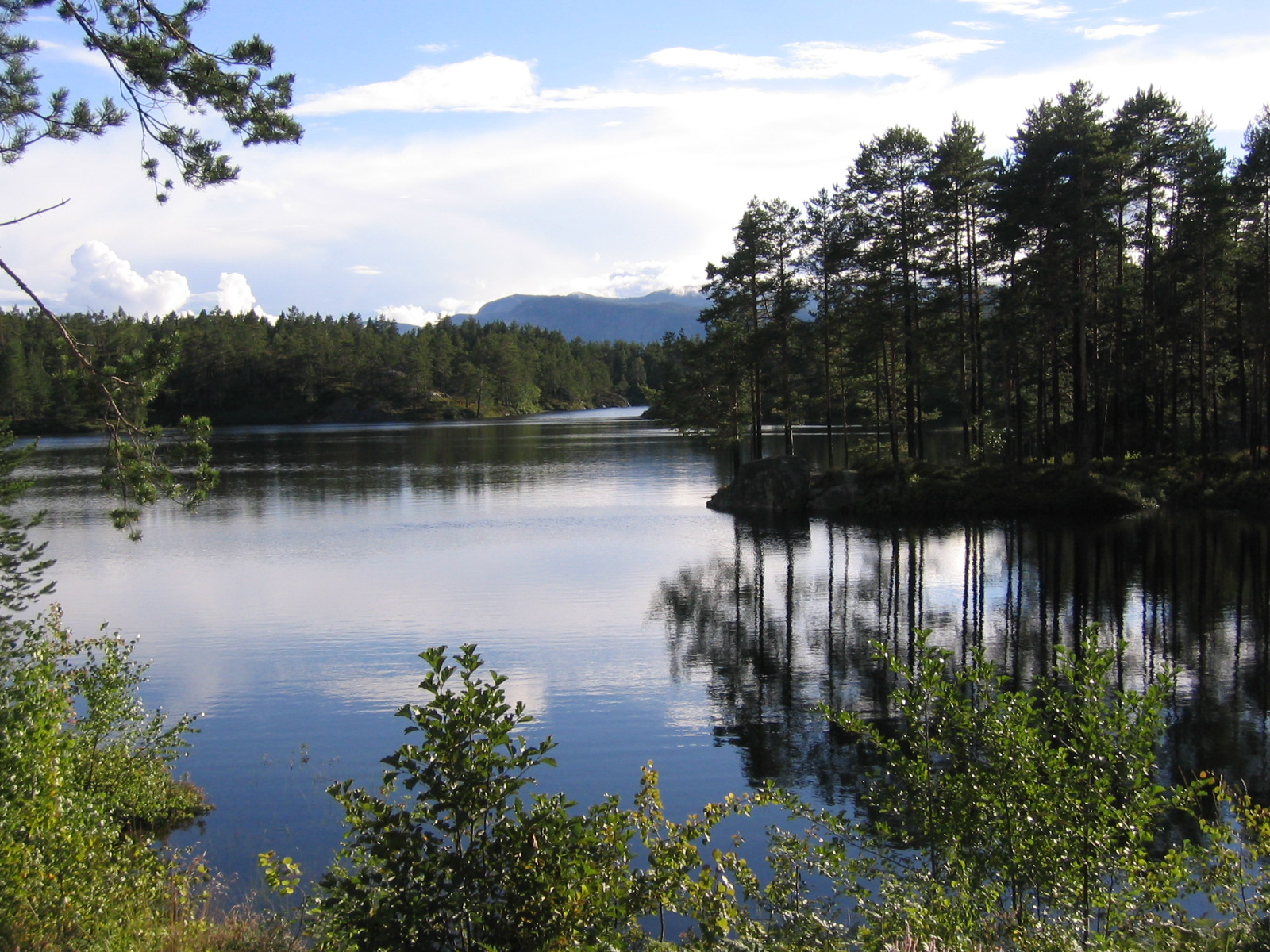

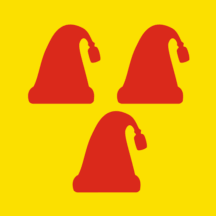
- Flag Coat of arms

- Telemark within Norway

- Nissedal within Telemark
- Coordinates: 59°4′35″N 8°31′6″E
- Country: Norway
- County: Telemark
- District: Vest-Telemark
- Established: 1 Jan 1838
  - Created as: Formannskapsdistrikt
- Administrative centre: Treungen

Government
  - Mayor (2023): Ian Parry-Jones (Sp)

Area
  - Total: 905.17 km^{2} (349.49 sq mi)
  - Land: 785.92 km^{2} (303.45 sq mi)
  - Water: 119.25 km^{2} (46.04 sq mi) 13.2%
  - Rank: #129 in Norway
- Highest elevation: 1,040.13 m (3,412.5 ft)

Population (2026)
  - Total: 1,509
  - Rank: #304 in Norway
  - Density: 1.9/km^{2} (4.9/sq mi)
  - Change (10 years): ▲ +4.6%
- Demonym: Nissedøl

Official language
  - Norwegian form: Nynorsk
- Time zone: UTC+01:00 (CET)
  - Summer (DST): UTC+02:00 (CEST)
- ISO 3166 code: NO-4030
- Website: Official website

Nissedal (Norwegian pronunciation: [²nɪsːəˌdɑːl]; locally [¹nɪsːdaːl]) is a rural municipality in Telemark region of Telemark county, Norway. It is part of the traditional regions of Upper Telemark and Vest-Telemark. The administrative centre of the municipality is the village of Treungen. Other villages in Nissedal include Kyrkjebygda and Felle.

The 905.17-square-kilometre (349.49 sq mi) municipality is the 129th largest by area of the 357 municipalities in Norway. Nissedal Municipality is the 304th most populous municipality in Norway with a population of 1,509. The municipality's population density is 1.9 inhabitants per square kilometre (4.9/sq mi) and its population has increased by 4.6% over the previous 10-year period. Nissedal Municipality has 2,246 vacation homes, so the population swells during holidays and vacation times.

Nissedal Municipality has been nicknamed the "Telemark Riviera" for its close proximity to Gautefall Alpine Center and for its many campgrounds and outdoor activities. There are a total of 1,750 lakes in the municipality, including Nisser, the seventh-largest lake in Norway, after which Nissedal is named. Gautefall, which is home to Telemark County's largest alpine center, lies adjacent to the municipality. For residents of the Oslo Fjord area, Gautefall is the nearest winter sport destination.

Nissedal's terrain is characterized by roche moutonnée rock formations, mountains, valleys, forests, wetlands, and lakes. Nissedal is a popular destination for outdoor activities such as paddling, fishing, swimming, mountain biking, hiking, kayaking, skiing, boating, and more. It is recognized as one of Norway’s best places for mountain climbing. Nissedal is home to Hægefjell, one of Norway's most popular mountain climbing destinations.

== General information ==
=== Administrative history ===
The formannskapsdistrikt law of 1837 created a system of local government in Norway by establishing each Church of Norway prestegjeld as a civil municipality. On 1 January 1838, Nissedal prestegjeld was established as Nissedal Municipality.

During the 1960s, there were many municipal mergers across Norway due to the work of the Schei Committee. On 1 January 1962, the Espestøl area (population: 7) of Åmli Municipality in Aust-Agder county was transferred to Nissedal Municipality in Telemark county. Then again on 1 January 1965, the unpopulated Espestøl, Reinefoss, and Espestølstykket areas of Åmli Municipality in Aust-Agder county were transferred to Nissedal Municipality in Telemark county. The borders have not changed since that time.

In 2020, there were many municipal and county mergers across Norway due to the work of the Solberg cabinet. Historically, this municipality was part of Telemark county. On 1 January 2020, the municipality became a part of the newly-formed Vestfold og Telemark county (after Telemark and Vestfold counties were merged). The merger was short-lived, and on 1 January 2024, the merger was undone and this municipality became part of Telemark county once again.

=== Etymology ===
The municipality (originally the parish) is named after the Nissedal valley (Old Norse: Nizidalr) since the first Nissedal Church was built in the valley. Nissedal was first mentioned in a written source in the 1300s under the name Nizudal. The current written form first emerged in the 1400s. The first element of the municipal name comes from the local lake Nisser, which was historically spelled Nizir. The first element is the lake name comes from the local river Nið, the old name for the river Nidelva. The last element of the lake name is sær which means "inland sea" or "large lake". Thus it is "the inland sea that feeds the river Nidelva". The last element of the municipal name is dalr which means "valley" or "dale".

Today, the name Nissedal refers to three geographical areas: 1) Nissedal Municipality, 2) the Nissedal parish in the Church of Norway which includes the villages on both sides of the lake Nisser, and 3) the villages of Nordbygda and Kyrkjebygda that are jointly referred to as "Nissedal village".

=== Coat of arms ===
The coat of arms was granted on 30 October 1992. The official blazon is "Or, three nisse hats gules" (Norwegian: På gull grunn tre raude nisseluer, 2-1). This means the arms have a field (background) has a tincture of Or which means it is commonly colored yellow, but if it is made out of metal, then gold is used. The charge is a set of three nisseluer, traditional red woolen hats often associated with the nisse, which were commonly worn until the late 19th century by farmers and common folk. It is a canting arms, since the name Nissedal has been "translated" into a visual pun with the three woolen hats, in spite of the name having nothing to do with the folkloric nisse. The arms were designed by Halvor Holtskog Jr. The municipal flag has the same design as the coat of arms.

=== Churches ===
The Church of Norway has one parish (sokn) within Nissedal Municipality. It is part of the Øvre Telemark prosti (deanery) in the Diocese of Agder og Telemark. Prior to 2012, the churches in the municipality were part of the Nissedal prestegjeld.

Churches in Nissedal Municipality
Parish (sokn)	Church name	Location of the church	Year built
Nissedal	Nissedal Church	Kyrkjebygda	1764
Nissedal	Treungen Church	Treungen	1863
Nissedal	Felle Chapel	Felle	1970

== History ==
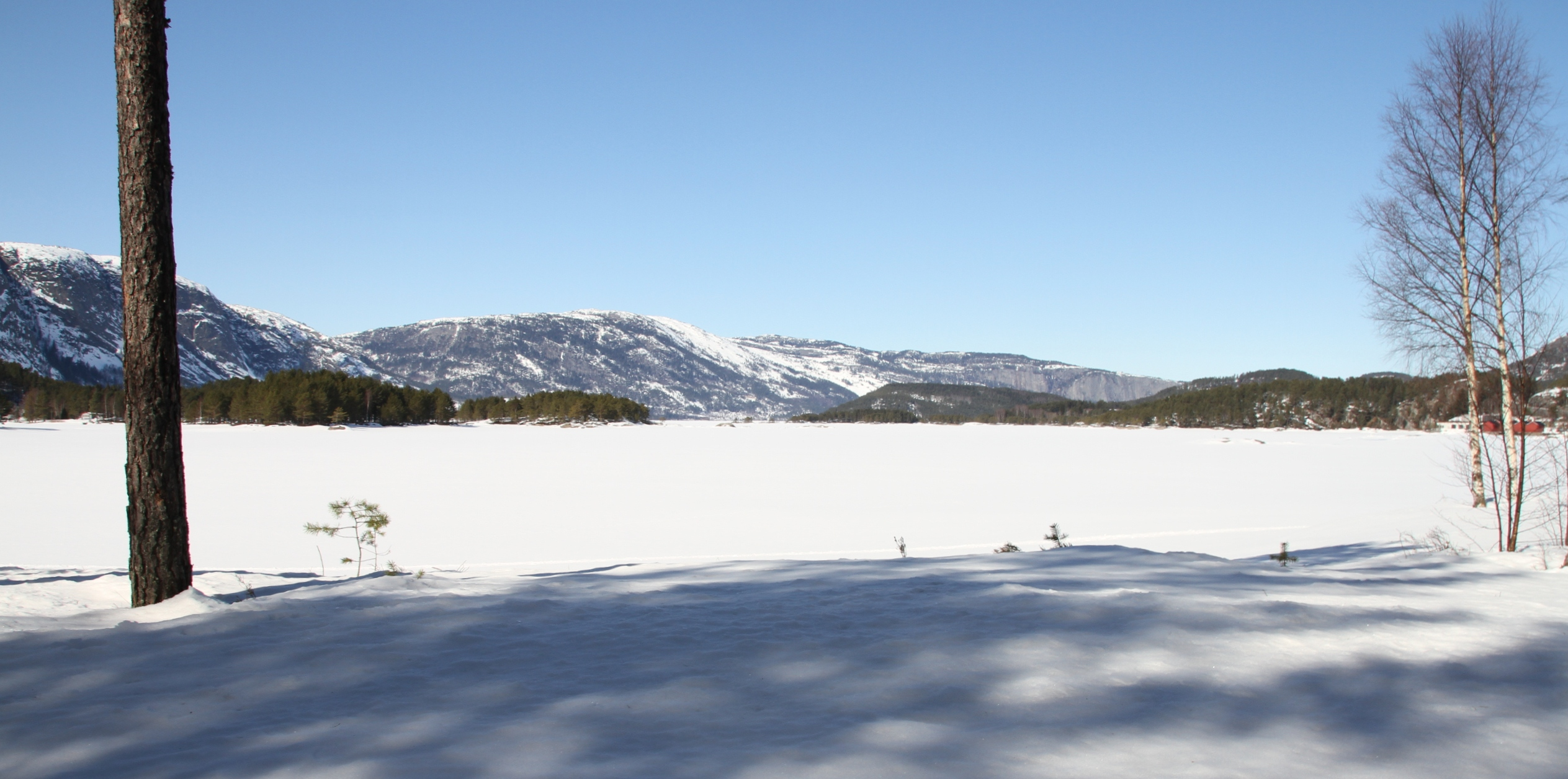
Lake Nisser during winter.

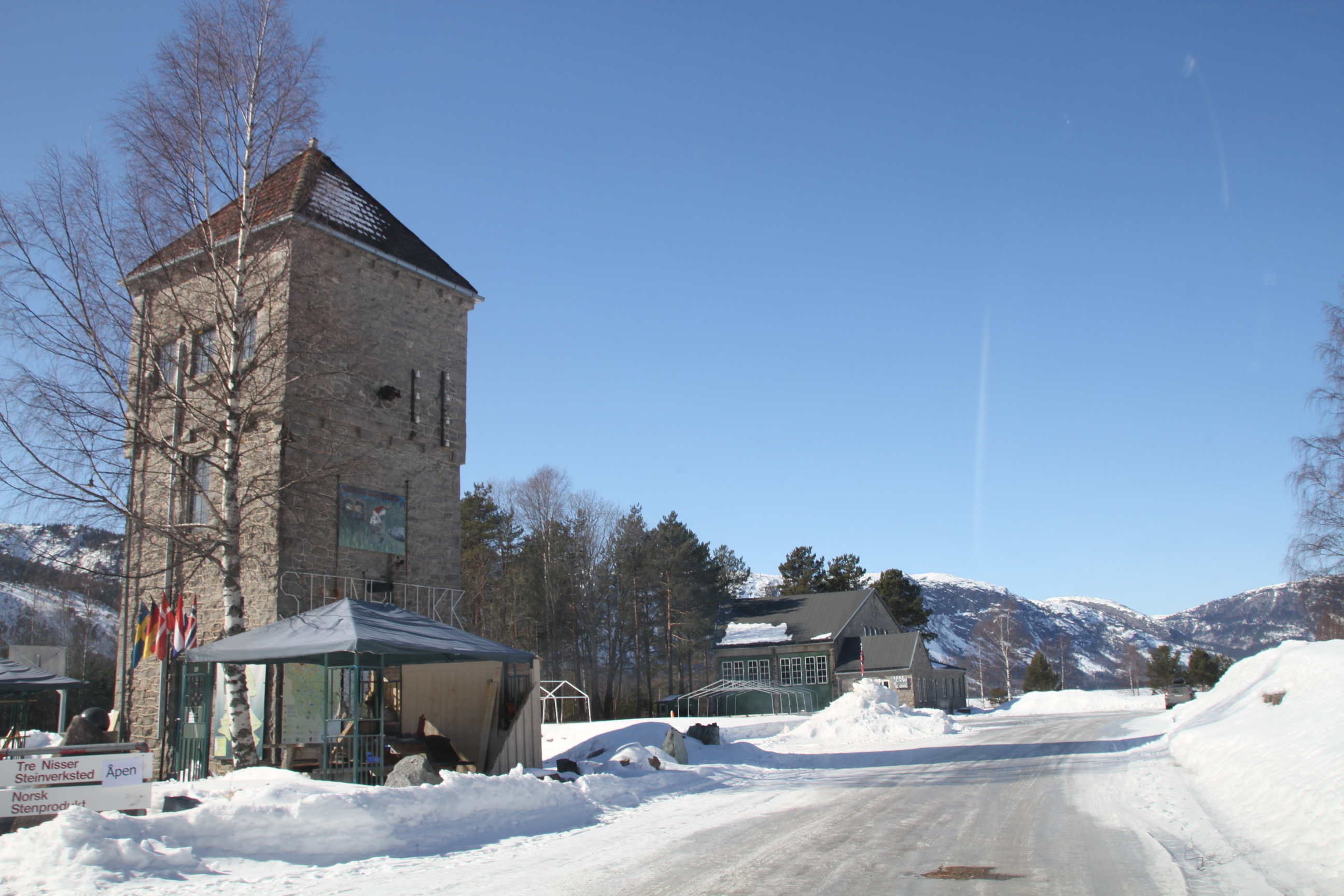
Sundmoen Stone Center.

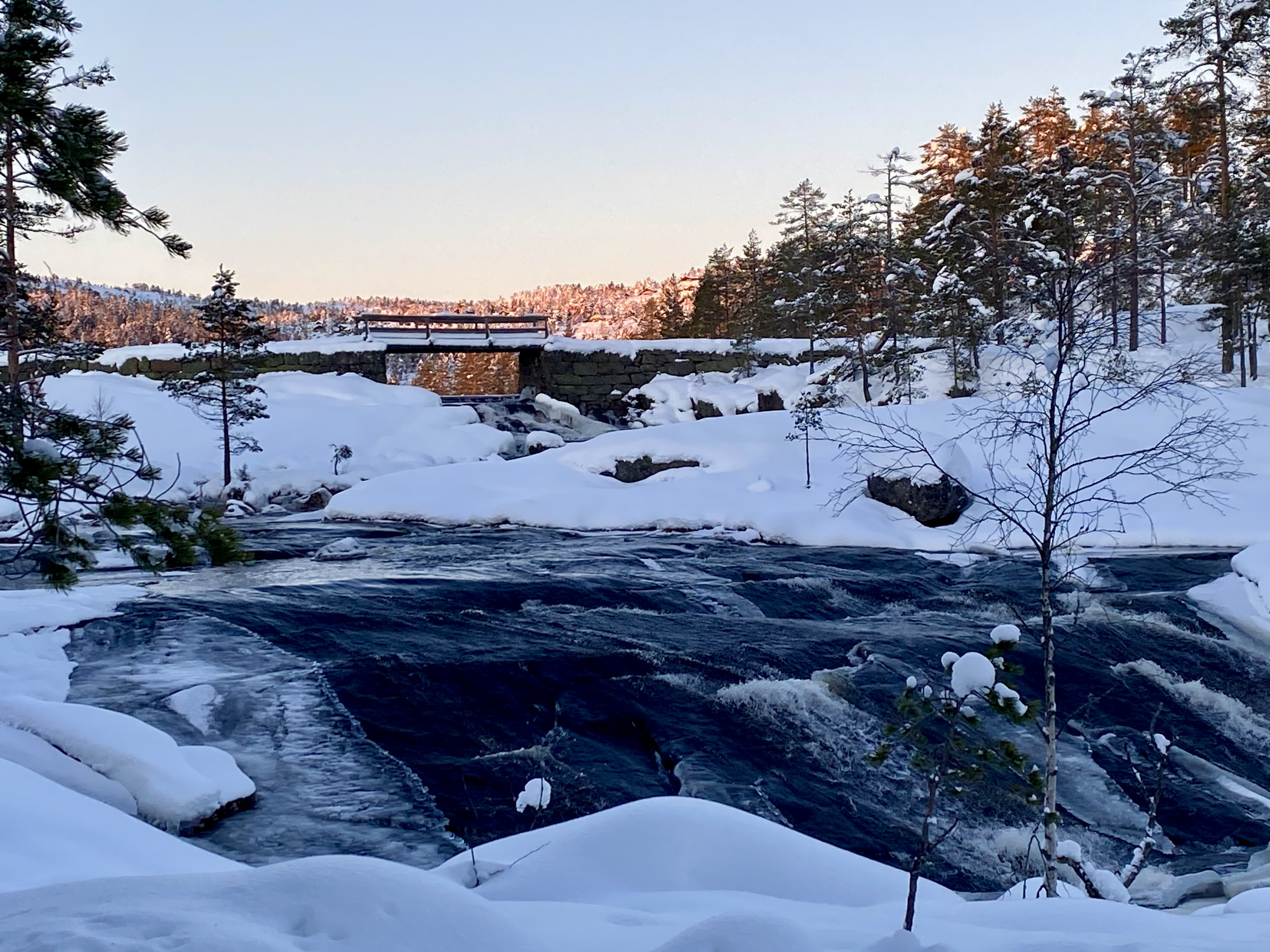
Bjønntjønndammen

The area of Nissedal Municipality has been populated for over 10,000 years. It was likely one of the first areas in Telemark to be inhabited, likely by people migrating from the south and southwest after the Ice Age. Most artifacts retrieved in Nissedal are dated to the Iron Age. However, older traces such as cairns, arrowheads, and stone axes have also been retrieved. Two ancient rock paintings can still be seen on the western shore of Lake Nisser, including paintings at Kvithamar by Fjone and at Trontveit further south. Bronze Age artifacts include swords and keys, while there are large burial mounds found in Fjone ("Kjempehaugane"). The ancient burial mounds have a diameter of 15–20 meters and are dated to the Iron Age.

One of the earliest areas to be populated in Nissedal was the cave Holmevasshelleren, approximately 40 metres (130 ft) from the lake Holmevatn at Kyrkjebygdheia. Archeological discoveries have dated prehistoric settlements at Holmevasshelleren to Neolithic times, 3800 BCE-6000 BCE. The cave is 18 metres (59 ft) long, 4 metres (13 ft) high, and 3 metres (9.8 ft) deep.

Ancient rock paintings from the Bronze Age can be seen at various sites in Nissedal, including by a steep mountain by Trontveit farm on the western side of the lake Nisser. Such paintings are also found by Kvithamar further north. The rock art site at Kvithammaren ("The White Crag") is named for the site where it is painted, namely a white niche in the mountainside, roughly 3–4 metres (9.8–13.1 ft) above the surface of Nisser Lake, at the foot of a 50-metre (160 ft) high cliff. It is easily visible from distance and may have been seen as openings in Earth and a link to the underworld. The other rock painting by Nisser Lake is known as Ovnen ("The Oven") and is located at the foot of a 20-metre (66 ft) high escarpment which originally jutted up in front of the panel. This painting depicts a row of human figures, an animal pictograph, and a pattern of zigzag lines. A local clergyman visited the paintings in the early 1800s and claimed the human figures at Ovnen to have been drawn by a monk in the memory of a bridal procession that drowned. Their colloquial name, Munkeskrifta ("The Monk’s Drawings"), is a reference to this. The paintings at Ovnen are naturally filled in iron oxides.

An ancient archeological monument from the Bronze Age, dating to 1800 BCE-500 BCE, can also be seen by Stolsvasslonene. It is a solar symbol of a sun wheel which is 40-centimeter in diameter. It can be reached by hiking the DNT trail between Uvdalen and Gautefall. It is likely an ancient symbol of fertility and possibly related to the nearby lake.

Heigeitilen, a boundary marker on the border between the three historic parishes of Tørdal, Nissedal, and Treungen, was first mentioned in written sources in 1792. It is likely an ancient marker and can be reached from the Heigeitilløypa trail (Heigeitilstien). It is a Milky Quartz mineral rock.

The Uvdalen valley has been populated since the Stone Age. Protected from the wind by the mountain Heitfjell, the area was likely inhabited for hundreds of years. Archeological surveys here have retrieved various artifacts from the Stone Age, including arrowheads and flint tools. The first written record of inhabitants in Uvdalen dates to 1574, while the last permanent inhabitants left the valley in 1910. The 1733 census indicates that Bjørn Alvson and his wife Torbjørg lived on a farm here with nine cows, 42 sheep, 16 goats, and two horses, among other animals. The 1865 census showed a total population of 24 in Uvdalen. Uvdalen was once home to one of the largest farms in Treungen.

Reinsvasshytta by the lake Reinsvatn was built in 1900 by Amboritius Olsen Lindvig and was Gautefallheia's first cabin.

In the 20th century, a number of dams were constructed at various lakes throughout Nissedal. Constructed by Sveinung Solli in 1900, the dam Bjønntjønndammen above the Bjønntjønnfossen waterfall was in use until the 1960s. It is located by Bjønntjønn ("Bear Lake") in the valley known as Bjønntjønndalen. The dam by nearby Mjåvatn, Mjåvassdammen, was also constructed around the year 1900 and was in use until the late 1960s. Another dam was constructed by Holmevassosen at the lake Holmevatn at Kyrkjebygdheia in 1965.

== Economy ==
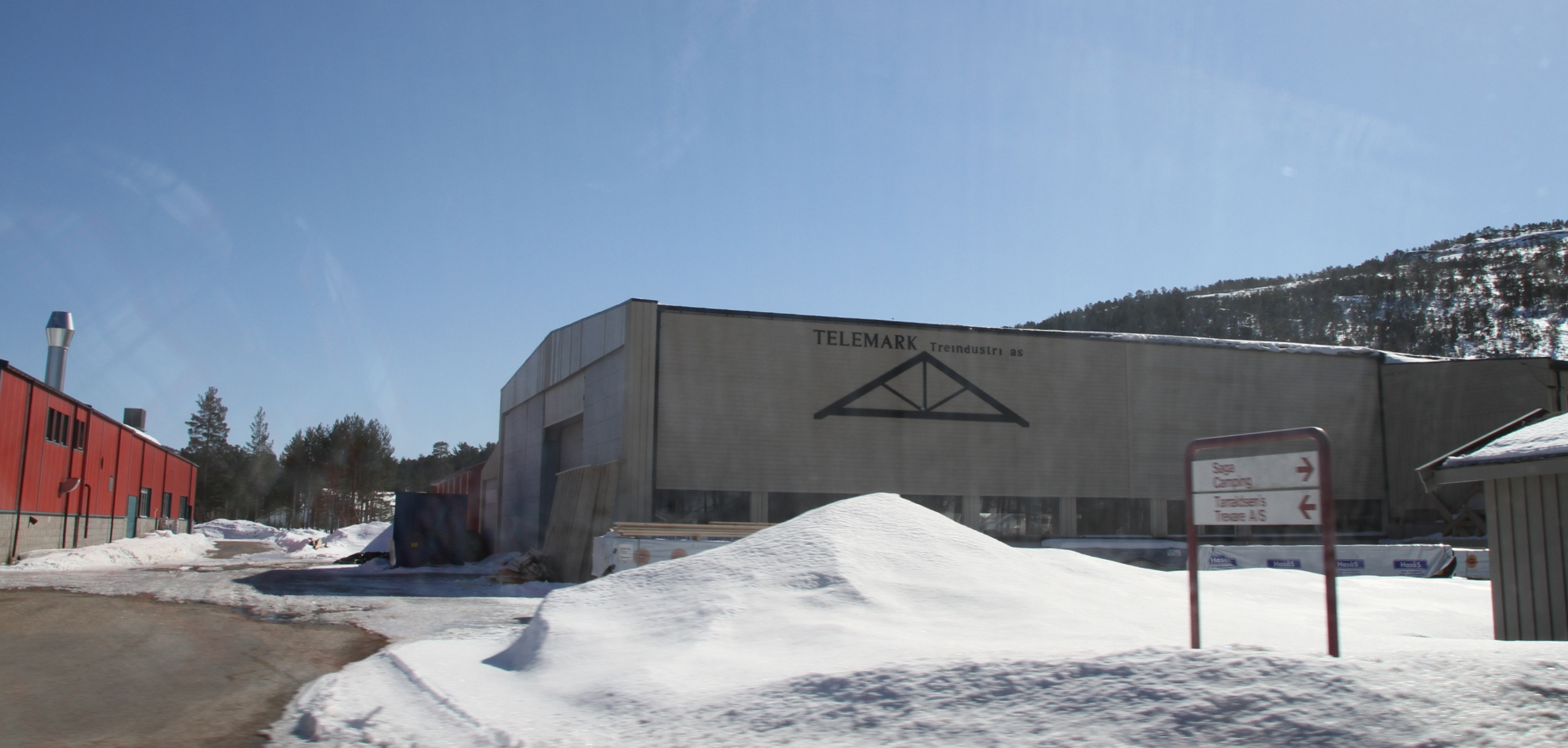
Telemark Treindustri AS.

Important industries in Nissedal are farming, forestry, fur farming, power supply and tourism. Forestry has been the most important industry in Nissedal since the 1600s. Berry collection was an important industry in the 1920s and 1930s, when berries were exported from Nissedal to Great Britain.

In recent years, tourism and the construction of vacation homes have become an important industry and largely replaced the fur farming industry. There were 2200 vacation homes in Nissedal in 2016, compared to a permanent population of 1476 inhabitants.

Hydropower remains an important industry in Nissedal. Aust-Agder Kraftverk has produced electricity here since 1919. Agder Energi has five stations in Treungen and Skagerak Energi has facilities in Fjone.

Two grocery stores are located in Treungen: SPAR and Coop Prix.

== Culture ==
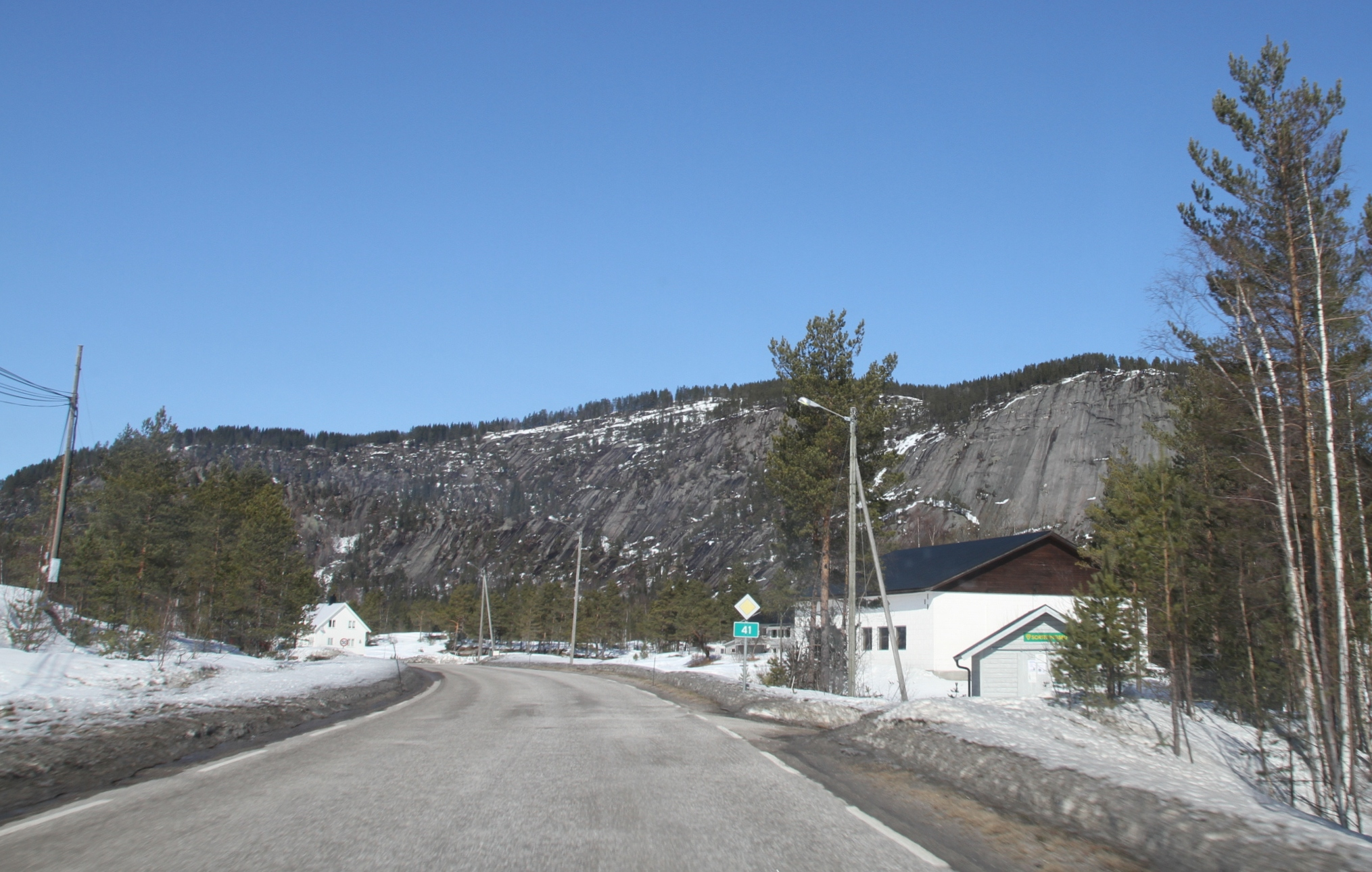
Road in Treungen.

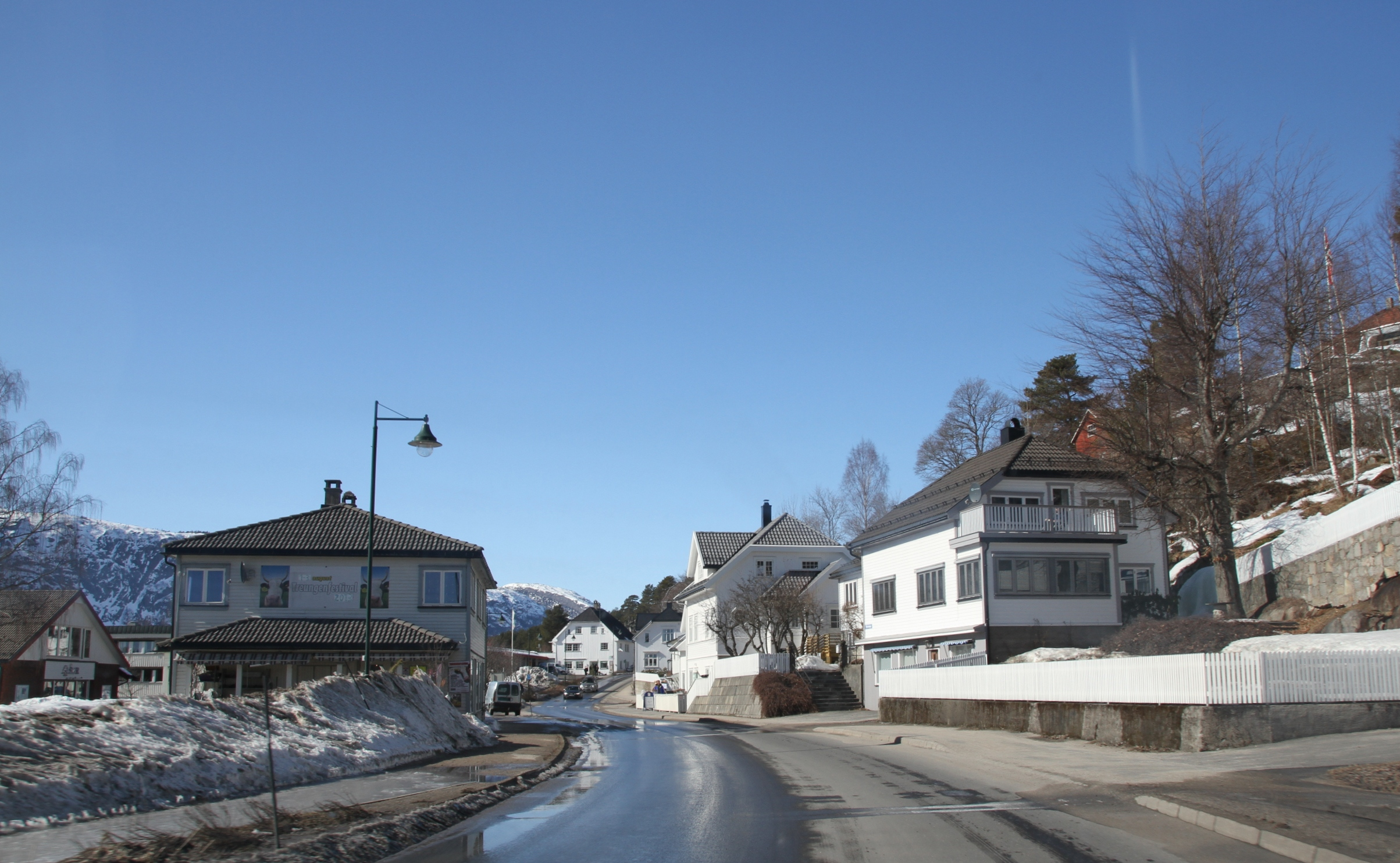
Village center in Treungen.

The Treungenfestival is an annual music festival attracting over 12,000 visitors per year.

Z Museum is located in Treungen and has exhibits of veteran cars and an over 1000-year-old wooden boat. The museum also has Norway's biggest collection of ancient telephones.

An additional museum, Sputnik Museum, is located nearby on the property of country music singer Sputnik (Knut T. Storbukås) in Bostrak. He was awarded Artist of the Year in 1990 by Dagbladet and is listed in the Guinness Book of Records. His collection of over 36 silver, gold, diamond, and platinum records are among the exhibits at the museum. The museum is notable for having a rocket placed on its rooftop.

== Government ==
Nissedal Municipality is responsible for primary education (through 10th grade), outpatient health services, senior citizen services, welfare and other social services, zoning, economic development, and municipal roads and utilities. The municipality is governed by a municipal council of directly elected representatives. The mayor is indirectly elected by a vote of the municipal council. The municipality is under the jurisdiction of the Øvre Telemark District Court and the Agder Court of Appeal.

=== Municipal council ===
The municipal council (Kommunestyre) of Nissedal Municipality is made up of 17 representatives that are elected to four-year terms. The tables below show the current and historical composition of the council by political party.

Nissedal kommunestyre 2023–2027
Party name (in Nynorsk)	Number of representatives
Labour Party (Arbeidarpartiet)	5
Progress Party (Framstegspartiet)	1
Conservative Party (Høgre)	2
Christian Democratic Party (Kristeleg Folkeparti)	3
Centre Party (Senterpartiet)	6
Total number of members:	17

Nissedal kommunestyre 2019–2023
Party name (in Nynorsk)	Number of representatives
Labour Party (Arbeidarpartiet)	7
Conservative Party (Høgre)	2
Christian Democratic Party (Kristeleg Folkeparti)	2
Centre Party (Senterpartiet)	6
Total number of members:	17

Nissedal kommunestyre 2015–2019
Party name (in Nynorsk)	Number of representatives
Labour Party (Arbeidarpartiet)	7
Progress Party (Framstegspartiet)	1
Conservative Party (Høgre)	1
Christian Democratic Party (Kristeleg Folkeparti)	3
Centre Party (Senterpartiet)	5
Total number of members:	17

Nissedal kommunestyre 2011–2015
Party name (in Nynorsk)	Number of representatives
Labour Party (Arbeidarpartiet)	5
Progress Party (Framstegspartiet)	2
Conservative Party (Høgre)	2
Christian Democratic Party (Kristeleg Folkeparti)	3
Centre Party (Senterpartiet)	5
Total number of members:	17

Nissedal kommunestyre 2007–2011
Party name (in Nynorsk)	Number of representatives
Labour Party (Arbeidarpartiet)	4
Progress Party (Framstegspartiet)	2
Conservative Party (Høgre)	1
Christian Democratic Party (Kristeleg Folkeparti)	6
Centre Party (Senterpartiet)	4
Total number of members:	17

Nissedal kommunestyre 2003–2007
Party name (in Nynorsk)	Number of representatives
Labour Party (Arbeidarpartiet)	4
Progress Party (Framstegspartiet)	2
Conservative Party (Høgre)	2
Christian Democratic Party (Kristeleg Folkeparti)	4
Centre Party (Senterpartiet)	3
Socialist Left Party (Sosialistisk Venstreparti)	2
Total number of members:	17

Nissedal kommunestyre 1999–2003
Party name (in Nynorsk)	Number of representatives
Labour Party (Arbeidarpartiet)	9
Conservative Party (Høgre)	3
Christian Democratic Party (Kristeleg Folkeparti)	5
Centre Party (Senterpartiet)	4
Total number of members:	21

Nissedal kommunestyre 1995–1999
Party name (in Nynorsk)	Number of representatives
Labour Party (Arbeidarpartiet)	8
Conservative Party (Høgre)	2
Christian Democratic Party (Kristeleg Folkeparti)	6
Centre Party (Senterpartiet)	5
Total number of members:	21

Nissedal kommunestyre 1991–1995
Party name (in Nynorsk)	Number of representatives
Labour Party (Arbeidarpartiet)	9
Conservative Party (Høgre)	1
Christian Democratic Party (Kristeleg Folkeparti)	4
Centre Party (Senterpartiet)	7
Total number of members:	21

Nissedal kommunestyre 1987–1991
Party name (in Nynorsk)	Number of representatives
Labour Party (Arbeidarpartiet)	10
Conservative Party (Høgre)	2
Christian Democratic Party (Kristeleg Folkeparti)	5
Centre Party (Senterpartiet)	4
Total number of members:	21

Nissedal kommunestyre 1983–1987
Party name (in Nynorsk)	Number of representatives
Labour Party (Arbeidarpartiet)	9
Conservative Party (Høgre)	2
Christian Democratic Party (Kristeleg Folkeparti)	5
Centre Party (Senterpartiet)	2
Socialist Left Party (Sosialistisk Venstreparti)	2
Liberal Party (Venstre)	1
Total number of members:	21

Nissedal kommunestyre 1979–1983
Party name (in Nynorsk)	Number of representatives
Labour Party (Arbeidarpartiet)	10
Conservative Party (Høgre)	2
Christian Democratic Party (Kristeleg Folkeparti)	6
Centre Party (Senterpartiet)	2
Liberal Party (Venstre)	1
Total number of members:	21

Nissedal kommunestyre 1975–1979
Party name (in Nynorsk)	Number of representatives
Labour Party (Arbeidarpartiet)	9
Conservative Party (Høgre)	1
Christian Democratic Party (Kristeleg Folkeparti)	6
Centre Party (Senterpartiet)	4
Liberal Party (Venstre)	1
Total number of members:	21

Nissedal kommunestyre 1971–1975
Party name (in Nynorsk)	Number of representatives
Labour Party (Arbeidarpartiet)	9
Christian Democratic Party (Kristeleg Folkeparti)	4
Centre Party (Senterpartiet)	4
Liberal Party (Venstre)	3
Local List(s) (Lokale lister)	1
Total number of members:	21

Nissedal kommunestyre 1967–1971
Party name (in Nynorsk)	Number of representatives
Labour Party (Arbeidarpartiet)	8
Conservative Party (Høgre)	1
Christian Democratic Party (Kristeleg Folkeparti)	3
Centre Party (Senterpartiet)	3
Liberal Party (Venstre)	4
Local List(s) (Lokale lister)	2
Total number of members:	21

Nissedal kommunestyre 1963–1967
Party name (in Nynorsk)	Number of representatives
Labour Party (Arbeidarpartiet)	10
Christian Democratic Party (Kristeleg Folkeparti)	3
Centre Party (Senterpartiet)	4
Liberal Party (Venstre)	4
Total number of members:	21

Nissedal heradsstyre 1959–1963
Party name (in Nynorsk)	Number of representatives
Labour Party (Arbeidarpartiet)	10
Christian Democratic Party (Kristeleg Folkeparti)	3
Centre Party (Senterpartiet)	3
Liberal Party (Venstre)	5
Total number of members:	21

Nissedal heradsstyre 1955–1959
Party name (in Nynorsk)	Number of representatives
Labour Party (Arbeidarpartiet)	11
Christian Democratic Party (Kristeleg Folkeparti)	2
Joint List(s) of Non-Socialist Parties (Borgarlege Felleslister)	8
Total number of members:	21

Nissedal heradsstyre 1951–1955
Party name (in Nynorsk)	Number of representatives
Labour Party (Arbeidarpartiet)	13
Joint List(s) of Non-Socialist Parties (Borgarlege Felleslister)	11
Total number of members:	24

Nissedal heradsstyre 1947–1951
Party name (in Nynorsk)	Number of representatives
Labour Party (Arbeidarpartiet)	11
Christian Democratic Party (Kristeleg Folkeparti)	2
Joint list of the Liberal Party (Venstre) and the Radical People's Party (Radikale Folkepartiet)	11
Total number of members:	24

Nissedal heradsstyre 1945–1947
Party name (in Nynorsk)	Number of representatives
Labour Party (Arbeidarpartiet)	8
Joint list of the Liberal Party (Venstre) and the Radical People's Party (Radikale Folkepartiet)	4
Local List(s) (Lokale lister)	12
Total number of members:	24

Nissedal heradsstyre 1937–1941*
Party name (in Nynorsk)	Number of representatives
Labour Party (Arbeidarpartiet)	12
Farmers' Party (Bondepartiet)	2
Liberal Party (Venstre)	4
Joint list of the Farmers' Party (Bondepartiet) and the Liberal Party (Venstre)	6
Total number of members:	24
Note: Due to the German occupation of Norway during World War II, no elections were held for new municipal councils until after the war ended in 1945.

=== Mayors ===
The mayor (Norwegian: ordfører) of Nissedal Municipality is the political leader of the municipality and the chairperson of the municipal council. The following people have held this position:

- 1838–1842: Hans Nielsen
- 1843–1843: Rasmus Nielsen Bakka
- 1844–1849: Niels Rasmussen Tvedt, Jr.
- 1850–1851: Hans Jacobsen Wiig
- 1852–1856: Paul Christiansen Grimstvedt
- 1857–1857: John Rasmussen Fjone
- 1858–1861: Niels Rasmussen Bakka
- 1862–1869: Olaus Halvorsen Bakka
- 1870–1870: Ole Nielsen Bakke
- 1871–1879: Ansteen Johnsen Næs
- 1880–1891: Christian Christiansen Vik
- 1892–1893: Ansteen Johnsen Næs
- 1894–1897: Jacob A. Midbø
- 1898–1898: Ansteen Johnsen Næs
- 1899–1907: Jacob Aarak
- 1908–1913: Hans Kilen
- 1914–1919: Brynjulv Nordbø, Sr.
- 1920–1925: Torleiv Øverland
- 1926–1931: Brynjulv Nordbø, Sr.
- 1932–1934: Osmund O. Heimdal
- 1935–1941: Gunnar Moen (Ap)
- 1941–1944: Olaus H. Dale (NS)
- 1944–1945: Gunstein Homme (NS)
- 1945–1947: Gunnar Moen (Ap)
- 1948–1951: Egil Haugsjå (V)
- 1952–1959: Tellef Haugsjå (Ap)
- 1960–1971: Johan Trondsen (KrF)
- 1971–1975: Torkjell Solheim (Ap)
- 1975–1979: Egil K. Tveit (KrF)
- 1979–1983: Johan Trondsen (KrF)
- 1983–1987: Kåre Gisle Rønningen (Ap)
- 1987–1989: Egil K. Tveit (KrF)
- 1989–1995: Brynjulv Nordbø (Sp)
- 1995–2007: Øyvind Tveit (KrF)
- 2007–2011: Anne-Nora Oma Dahle (Sp)
- 2011–2023: Halvor Homme (Ap)
- 2023–present: Ian Parry-Jones (Sp)

== Geography ==
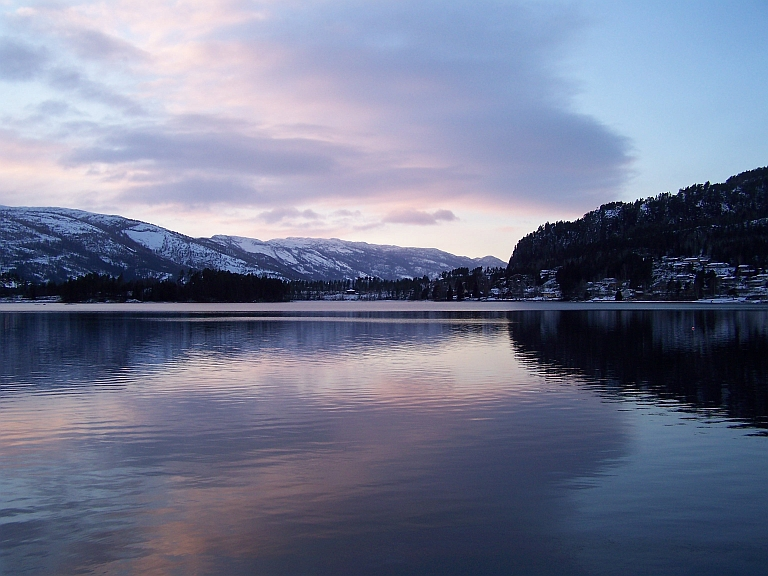
Nisser is the largest lake in Telemark County, and one of 1,750 lakes in Nissedal.

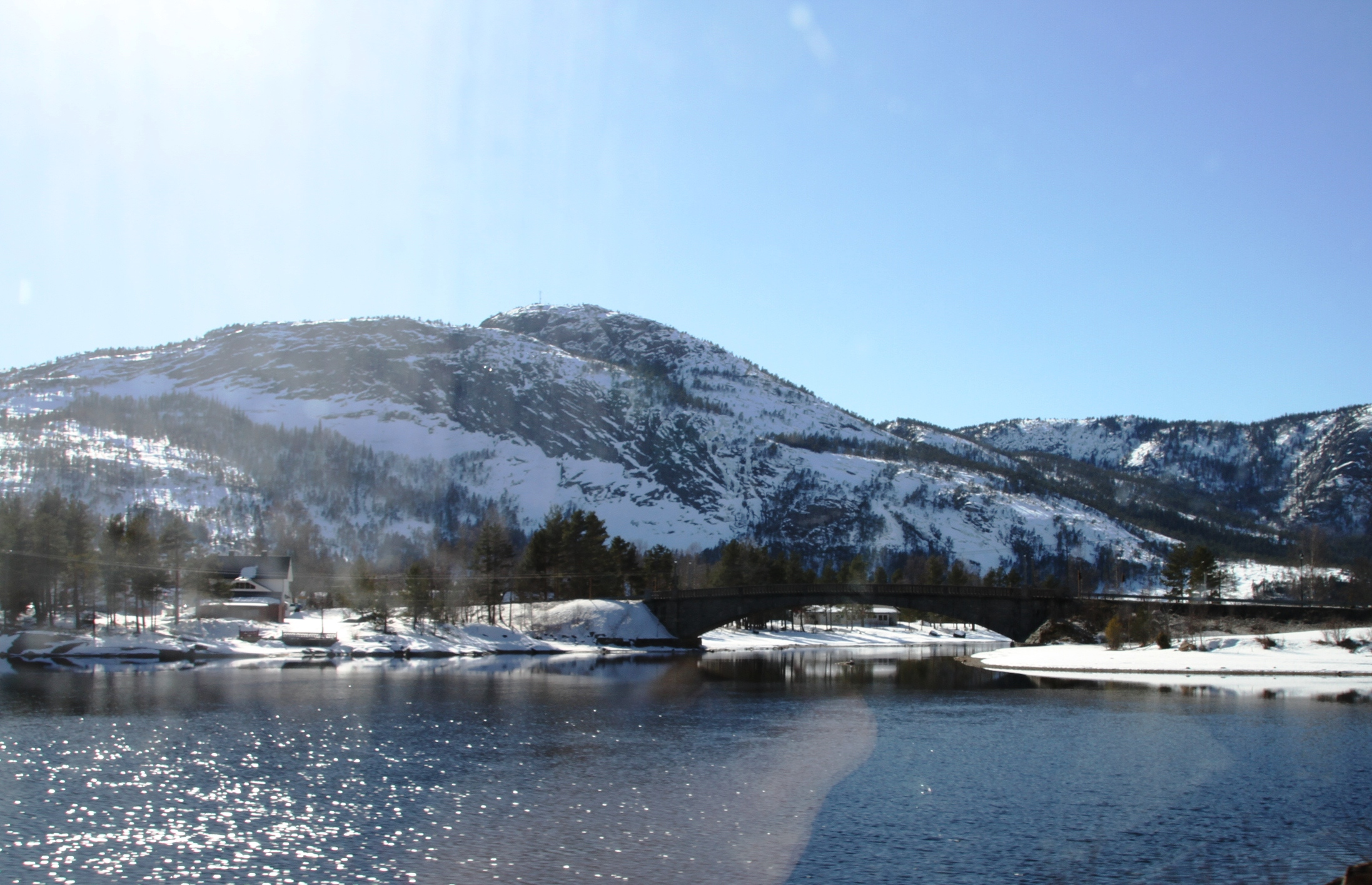
The river Storåna and Skuggenatten mountain.

Nissedal is a municipality covering an area of 905.17 square kilometres (349.49 sq mi) in Telemark County. The municipality is bordered by Fyresdal Municipality to the west, Kviteseid Municipality to the north, Drangedal Municipality to the east (also in Telemark) and it is bordered by Gjerstad Municipality, Vegårshei Municipality, and Åmli Municipality to the south (in Agder county). It is centered on the less rugged eastern shore of the large lake Nisser. Nisser Lake, which is approximately 40 kilometres (25 mi) in length and 250 metres (820 ft) deep, is the largest in the county and the seventh-largest lake in Norway.

Nissedal is one of the municipalities with the most vacation homes in Norway. Nissedal is home to three times more cabins than residential homes as of 2018: 2,350 vacation cabins and 735 houses.

The only urban area in Nissedal is the village of Treungen (which includes Tveitsund), but the other notable villages include Felle, Nordbygda, Fjone, and Kyrkjebygda. While the village of Treungen is by far the largest settlement (with a population of about 500), Felle with 100 residents is the second-largest settlement in Nissedal. Treungen is located by the southernmost part of the lake Nisser. Treungen lies where the river Nidelva begins, a river that flows by Haugsjåhund, Åmli, and Arendal before discharging into the ocean near Arendal. Treungen is surrounded by tall mountains such as Baremlandsfjellet (Skuggenatten), Sollifjell, Husfjell, and Skålefjell.

The Telemark Road (Norwegian National Road 41) passes through Treungen and Kyrkjebygda on the east side of the lake.

The highest point in the municipality is the 1,040.13-metre (3,412.5 ft) tall mountain Førheinutane, located on the border with Fyresdal Municipality.

=== Nature preserves ===
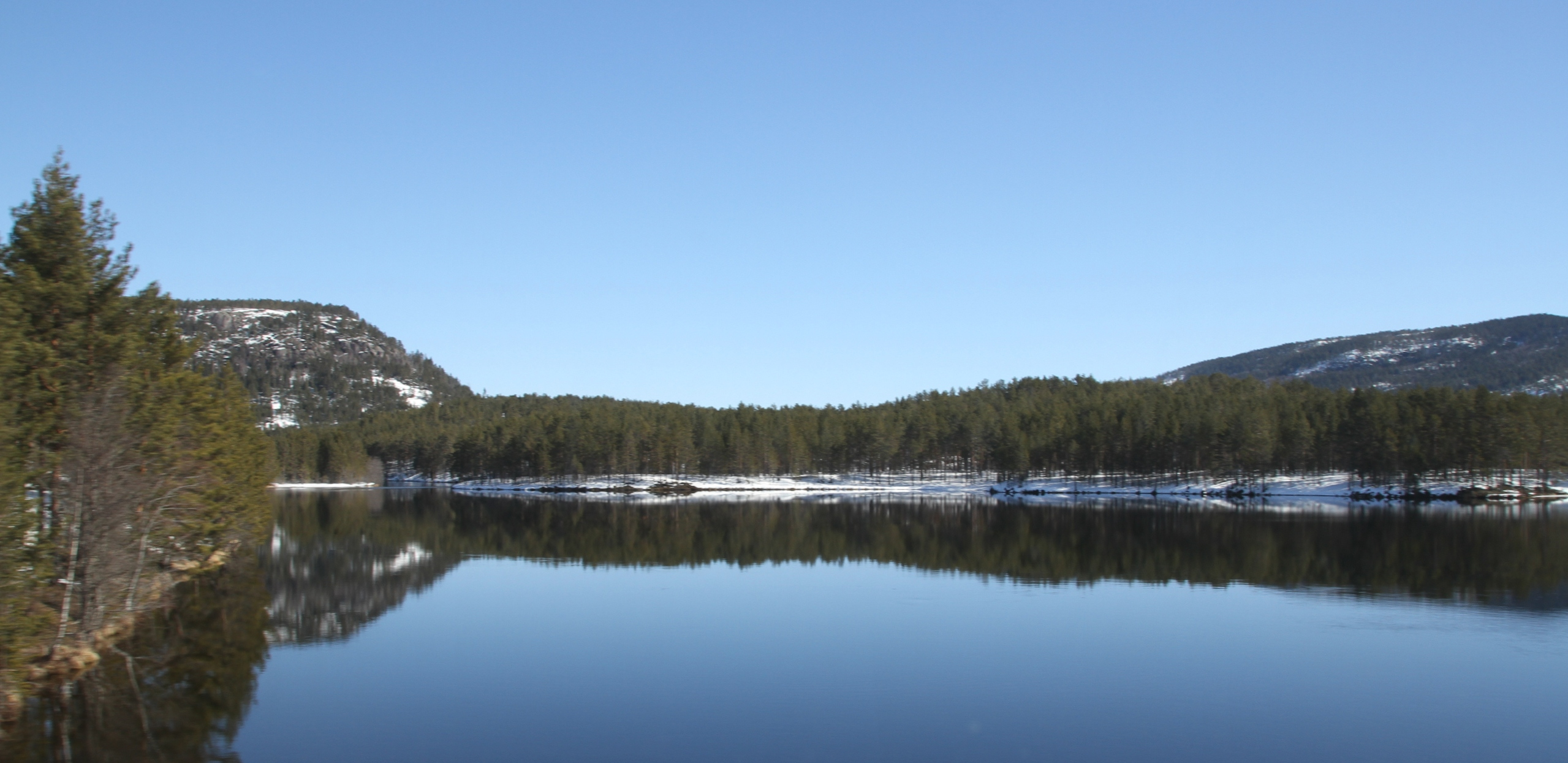
Vidmyrkollen.

Solhomfjell and Kvenntjønnane are two nature preserves located on the border between Gjerstad Municipality and Nissedal Municipality. In 1993, the 23,400-decare (5,800-acre; 9.0 sq mi) Solhomfjell Nature Preserve was established near the valley Uvdalen. This preserve was expanded in 2005 and includes plateaus, roche moutonnée rock formations, valleys, swamps, along with forests of Wych-elm, Oak and Littleleaf linden trees. Another nearby preserve, Kvenntjønnane Nature Preserve, is located nearby on top of Mjeltenatten. This 12,000-decare (3,000-acre; 4.6 sq mi) preserve was established in 2009 with the purpose of protecting the untouched nature with its wide biological diversity of various types of nature, ecosystems, and species. Although the main trailhead for these preserves is located at Felehovet on Gautefallheia, there are also trails here from the lakes Feletjønn and Bjønntjønn in Nissedal.

Other nature preserves in Nissedal include Lytingsdalen (established in 1989), Vidmyr (1975), and Heitfjell (2005). Lytingsdalen Nature Preserve was established to protect its untouched landscape and its wildlife and flora. Several pine trees at Lytingsdalen are over 500 years old. Vidmyr was established to protect its marsh-type landscape of suboceanic character. The flora here includes species such as purple moor-grass and bog asphodel.

== Climate ==
Nissedal has a temperate oceanic climate (Cfb by the Köppen-Geiger system). If 0 °C (32 °F) is used as winter threshold as in US, Nissedal has a humid continental climate. The all-time high temperature 31.8 °C (89.2 °F) has been recorded in all three summer months - June 1970, July 1991 and August 1975. The all-time low is −34.6 °C (−30.3 °F) recorded 9 February 1966. Precipitation is fairly evenly spread out over the year, with significant precipitation also in the driest months. The wettest months are August - November, and the driest months are February - April. The Tveitsund weather station has been recording since 1944.

Climate data for Tveitsund 1991-2020 (252 m, extremes 1919-2021 includes earlier station)
Month	Jan	Feb	Mar	Apr	May	Jun	Jul	Aug	Sep	Oct	Nov	Dec	Year
Record high °C (°F)	12.5 (54.5)	16.3 (61.3)	19.4 (66.9)	22.5 (72.5)	28.1 (82.6)	31.8 (89.2)	32.5 (90.5)	31.8 (89.2)	26.4 (79.5)	22.8 (73.0)	15.1 (59.2)	12.8 (55.0)	32.5 (90.5)
Mean daily maximum °C (°F)	1.3 (34.3)	1.8 (35.2)	5.4 (41.7)	10.1 (50.2)	15.5 (59.9)	19.5 (67.1)	21.7 (71.1)	20.3 (68.5)	15.7 (60.3)	9.6 (49.3)	4.8 (40.6)	1.9 (35.4)	10.6 (51.1)
Daily mean °C (°F)	−2 (28)	−2.1 (28.2)	0.5 (32.9)	4.6 (40.3)	9.5 (49.1)	13.6 (56.5)	15.9 (60.6)	14.7 (58.5)	11 (52)	5.9 (42.6)	1.9 (35.4)	−1.1 (30.0)	6.0 (42.8)
Mean daily minimum °C (°F)	−4.9 (23.2)	−5.3 (22.5)	−3.5 (25.7)	0.1 (32.2)	4 (39)	8.1 (46.6)	10.8 (51.4)	10.2 (50.4)	7.2 (45.0)	2.8 (37.0)	−0.6 (30.9)	−3.9 (25.0)	2.1 (35.7)
Record low °C (°F)	−27.5 (−17.5)	−34.6 (−30.3)	−26.6 (−15.9)	−15 (5)	−4.8 (23.4)	−1.3 (29.7)	1.9 (35.4)	1 (34)	−3.9 (25.0)	−11.2 (11.8)	−17.3 (0.9)	−23 (−9)	−34.6 (−30.3)
Average precipitation mm (inches)	89.1 (3.51)	56.7 (2.23)	50.3 (1.98)	49.5 (1.95)	72.4 (2.85)	79.1 (3.11)	93.7 (3.69)	110 (4.3)	99 (3.9)	114.1 (4.49)	107.7 (4.24)	85.8 (3.38)	1,007.4 (39.63)
Average precipitation days (≥ 1.0 mm)	13	10	9	9	9	10	11	11	11	12	13	12	130
Source 1: yr.no statistics Tveitsund
Source 2: NOAA-WMO averages 91-2020 Norway

== Demographics ==
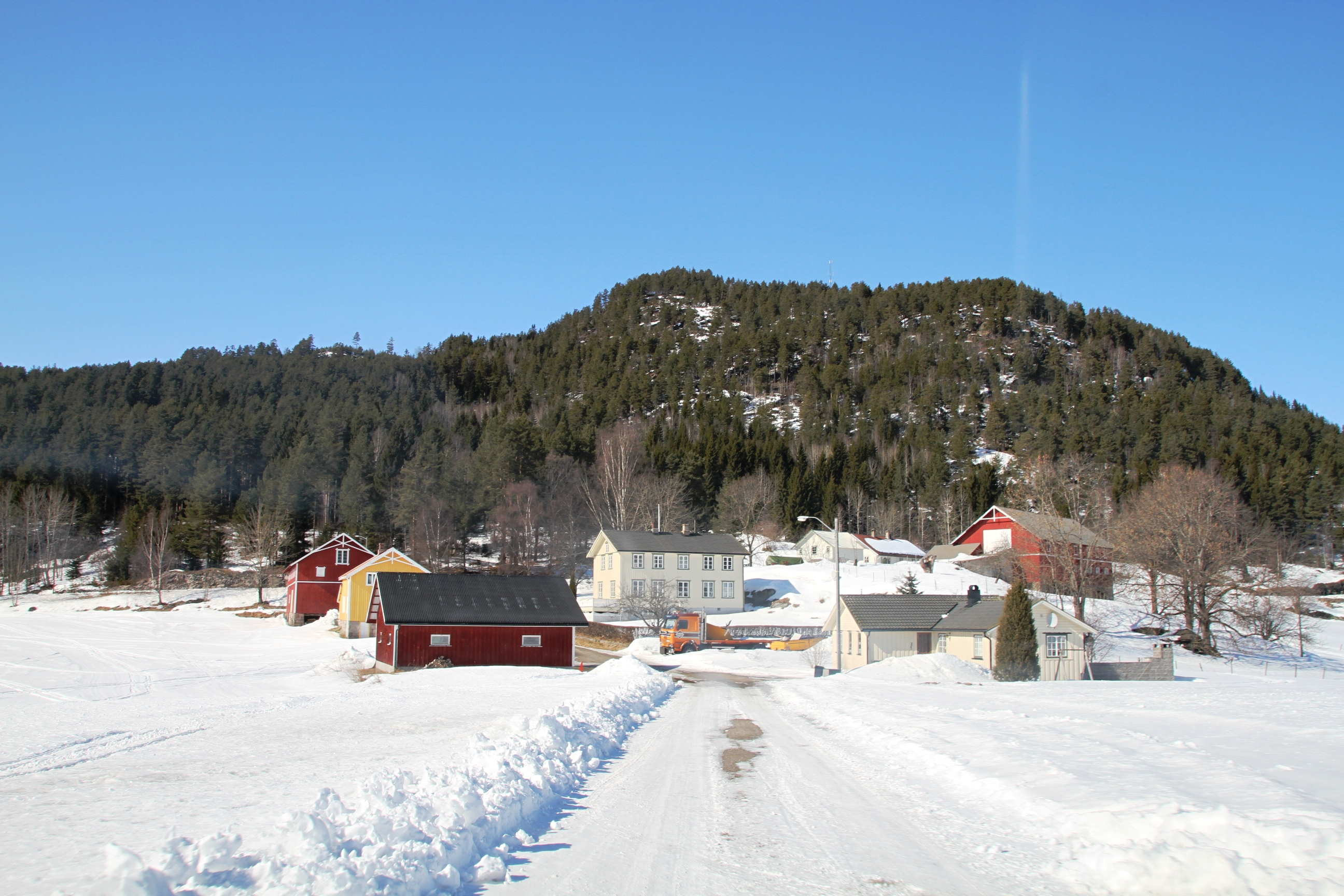
Farm near Husfjell mountain.

Nissedal has the second-lowest population of all municipalities in Telemark. According to Statistics Norway, Nissedal was home to 1,489 inhabitants in 2017, but had 2,246 cabins. 28.2 percent of local residents lived on agricultural- or forestry properties. 74.3 percent were members of Church of Norway as of 2017, while 10.7 percent were members of another religious community. The largest immigrant groups in 2018 (first and second generation) were from the Netherlands (35 people), Syria (22), Poland (21) and Denmark (16).

Nissedal reached its highest population in the year 1850 when 1,800 people resided in Nissedal. Large-scale emigration to the United States took place from 1840. Today, there are more people originating from Nissedal in the U.S. than in Norway.

During the winter holiday season, Nissedal's population triples and occasionally quadruples.

== Recreation ==
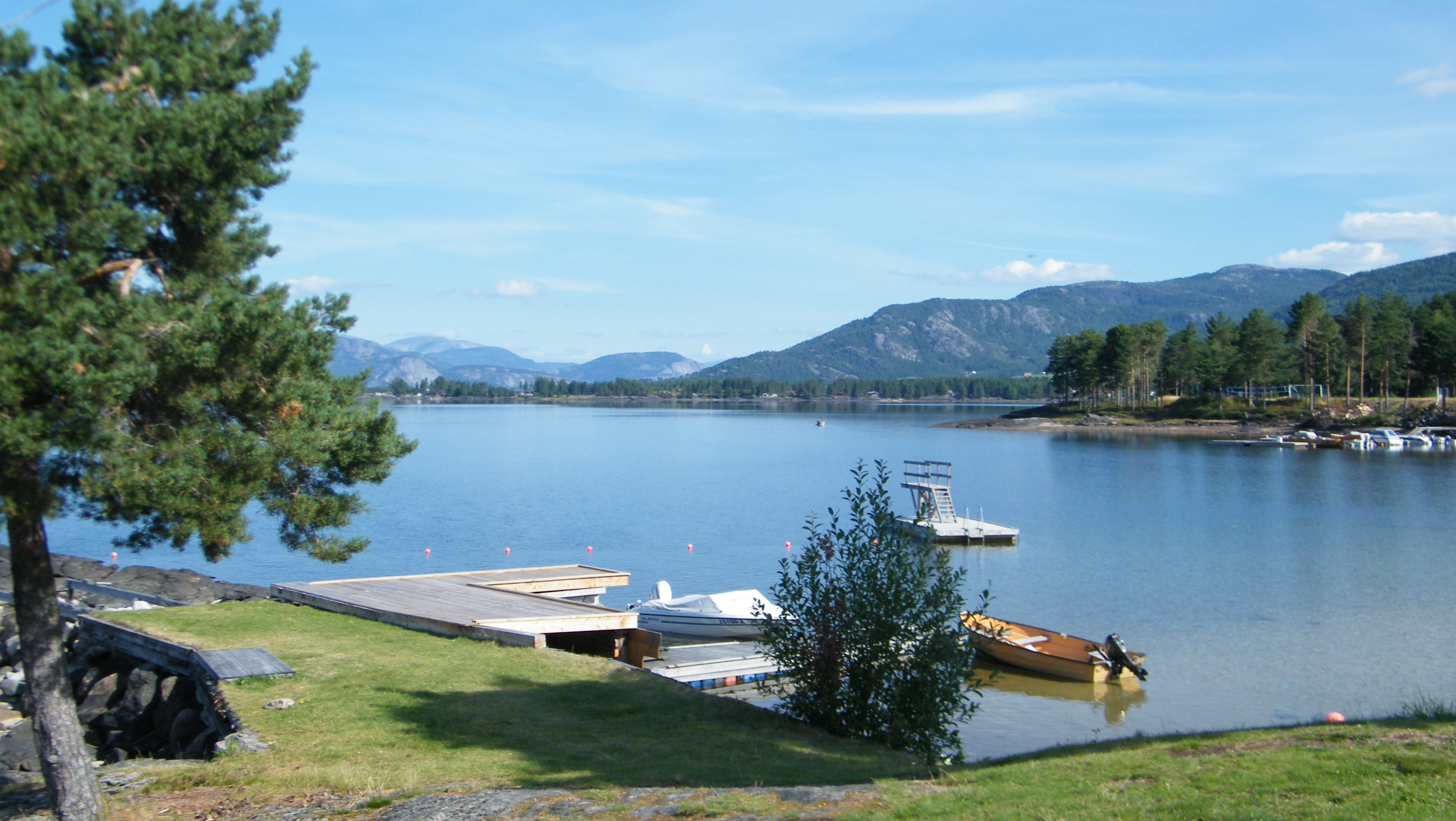
Camping at Nisser Lake.

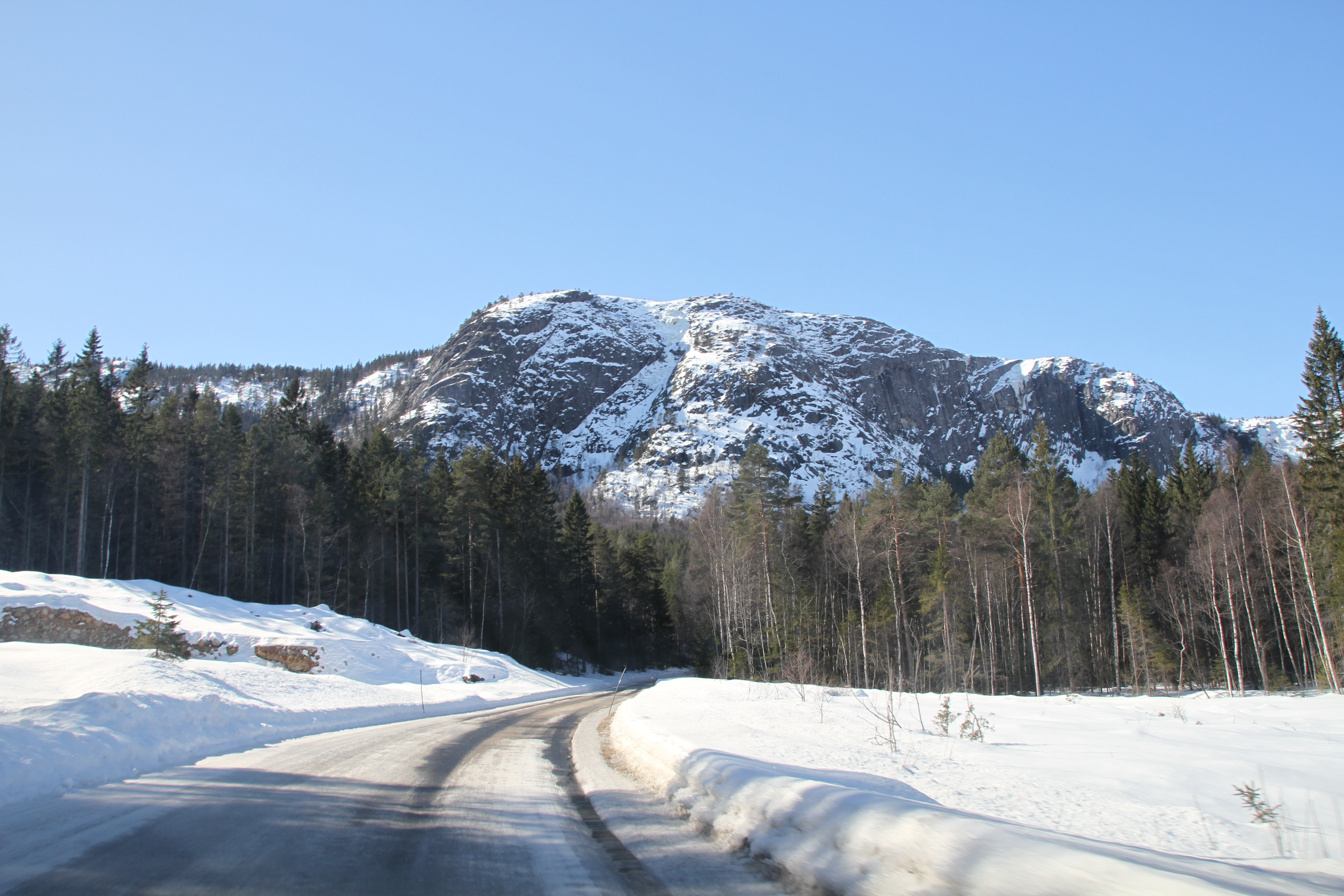
Langfjell Mountain.

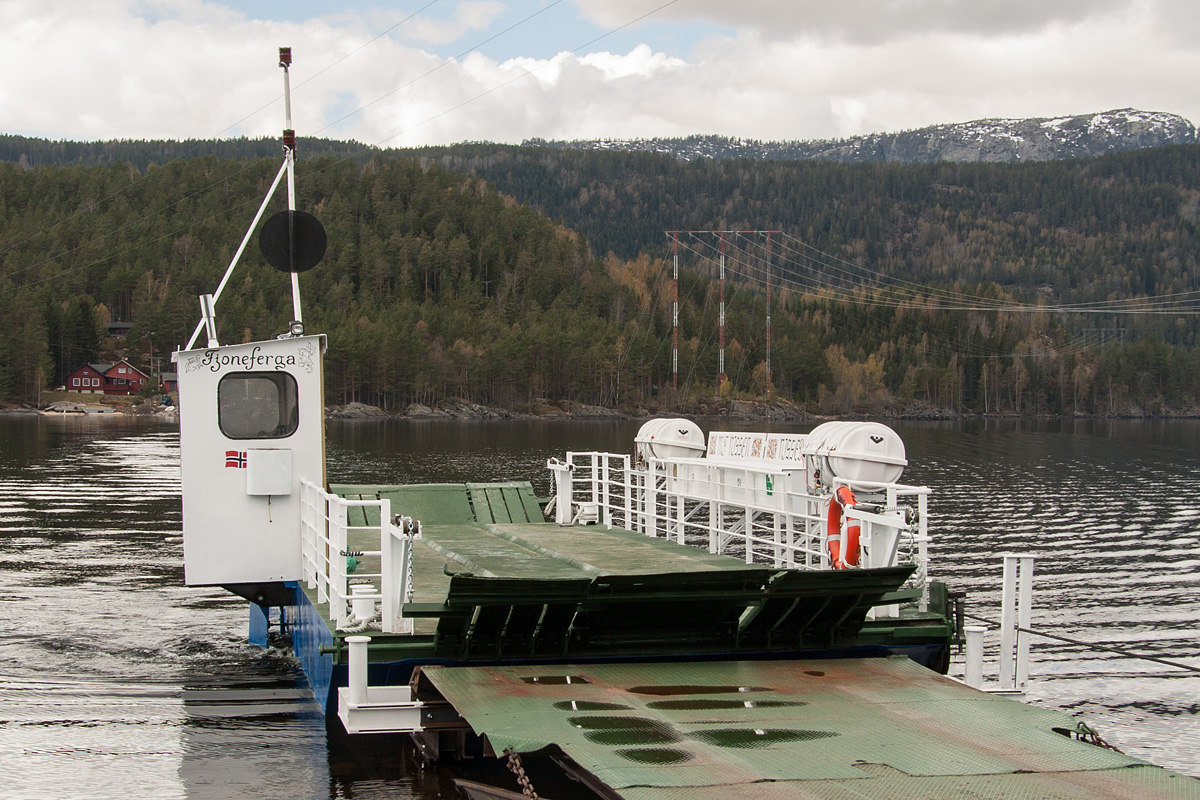
The cable ferry MF «Nissen» (Fjoneferga) at Sundsodden. It is Norway's smallest cable ferry.

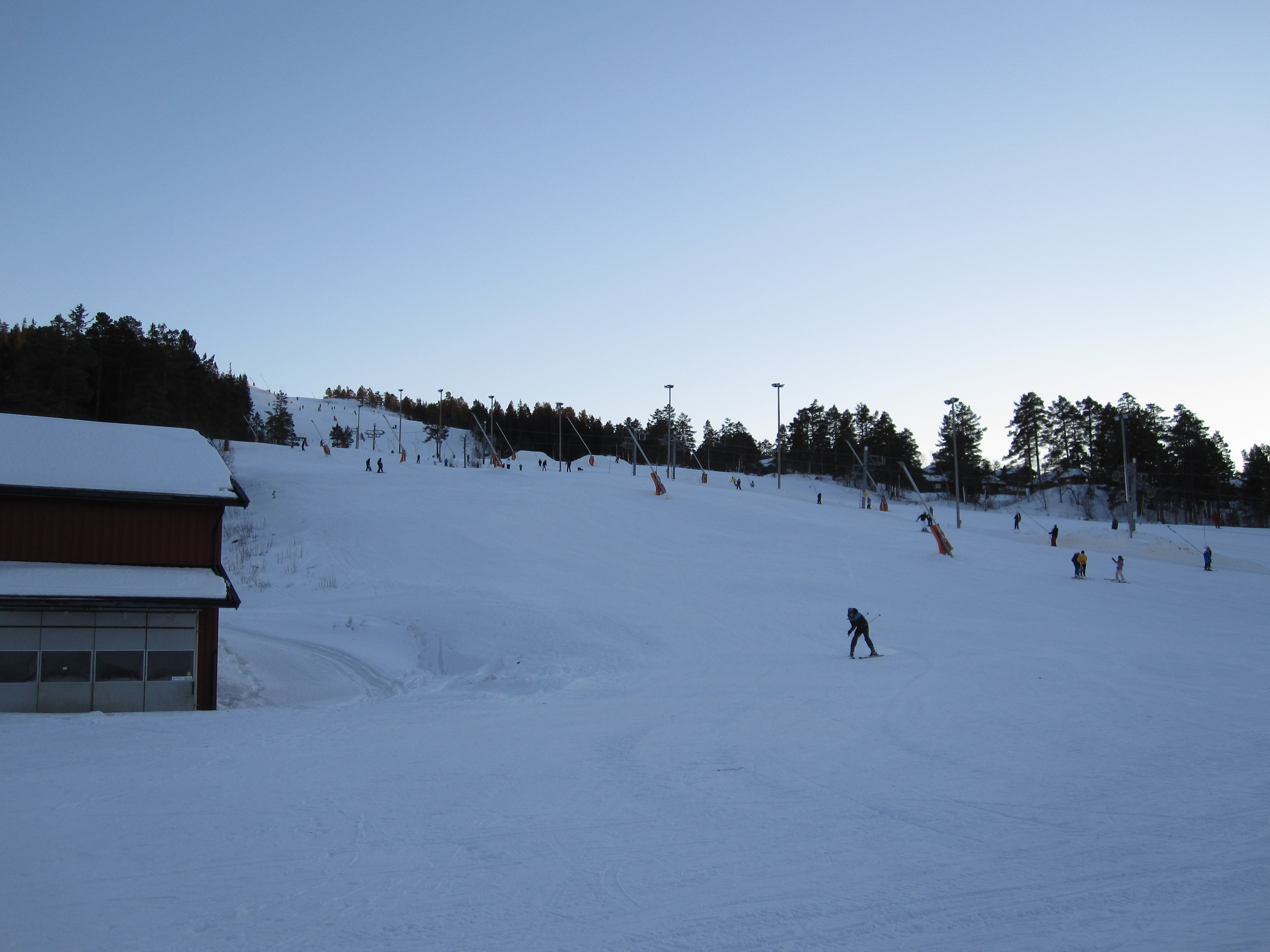
Slopes at Gautefall Ski Center.

Located adjacent to Gautefall, Telemark County’s largest alpine center, Nissedal is primarily a winter destination. It is home to six cross-country skiing trails (loipes), including trails connecting Nissedal and Gautefall. Cross-country skiing trails are found throughout Nissedal, including at Kykjebygdheia, Fjone Høgfjell, Felle, Gautefallheia, and Vrådal. Opportunities for alpine skiing, snowblading, snowboarding, Telemark skiing, and mountain skiing are found at Vrådal Ski Center and Gautefall Alpine Center. Over 100 km (62 mi.) of marked cross country skiing trails are found at adjacent Gautefall.

Summer activities include fishing, swimming, mountain climbing, hiking, mountain biking, kayaking, camping, and more. Many of Nissedal's 1,750 lakes are used for fishing, including Nisser Lake. The sandy shores of Nisser Lake is used for sunbathing, while the lake is used for swimming, boating, fishing and more. Perch, Trout, Lavaret and Arctic char are some of the fish species found in the lake. At the last count in 1991, Nisser Lake was home to 3.9 million fish. The fishing license in Fjone gives access to 20 lakes used for fishing as well as use of recreational boats and various lean-to and lavvos used for lodging. Lake Nisser is a popular destination for boating, canoeing, kayaking, and fishing.

There are boat rentals by Nisser Lake, at Tjørull, and the river Nidelva. A ferry, Fjoneferja (M/F "Nissen"), has been operating at Nisser Lake since 1947 and is Norway's smallest cable ferry. It is one of few remaining active cable ferries in Norway, and connects Sundesodden to Fjone. Rock carvings, burial mounds and other remains of ancient civilization have been discovered surrounding Nisser Lake.

Campgrounds include Sandnesodden, Vik (north of Kykjebygda), and Nisser Hyttegrend and Camping.

=== Skiing ===
Popular destinations for skiing include Fjone Høgfjell, Kyrkjebygdheia Skisenter, near Breilivatn at Kyrkjebygdheia, at Baksås, Nordbø Skileikanlegg, and Alpinbakken and Ljosløypa in Treungen. There are a total of 45 kilometres (28 mi) of cross-country skiing trails at Felle with trails leading over mountains such as Havrefjell and Vedlausfjell. Vrådal Alpine and Ski Center is used for both cross country skiing and alpine skiing. This center lies in-between Vråvatn and Nisser.

=== Mountain climbing ===
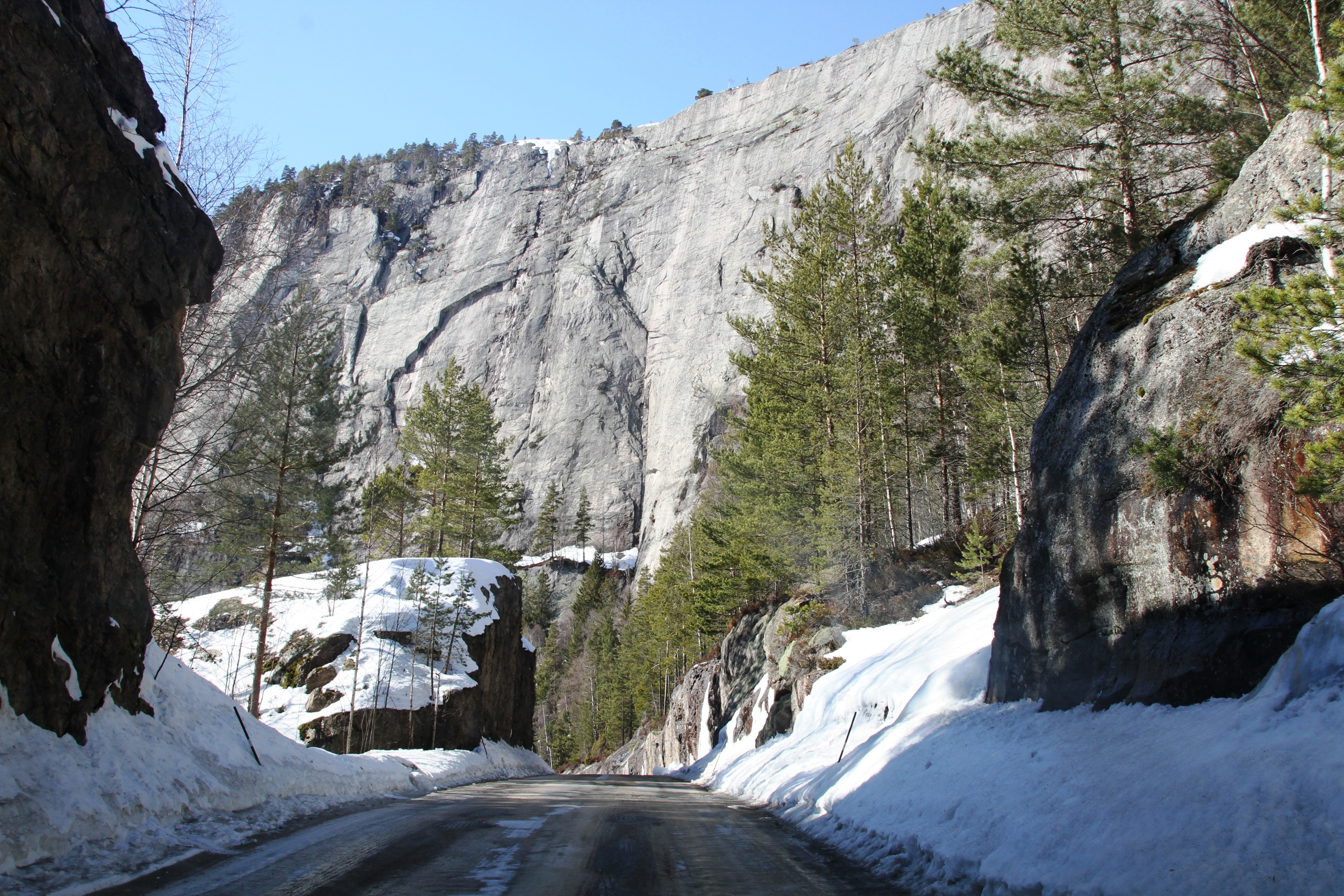
Ufshomfjellet

Nissedal is one of Norway's most popular destinations for mountain climbing. Roughly twenty mountains are regularly used for climbing and Hægefjell is the most hiked mountain in Nissedal. Other attractions include mountains such as Ånundsbufjellet, Langfjell, Skålfjell and Baremslandsfjellet. Hægefjell has since the late 1980s become one of the most popular sites for mountain climbing in Norway. The mountain, which has been featured in the TV series 71 Degrees North in 2010, has around 50 different hiking trails. It has an elevation of 1,021 metres (3,350 ft). From Hægefjell are views of Lake Nisser and Vrådal in the northeast, Nordbygda and Kyrkjebygda in the southeast, Fyresdal Municipality and Setesdalsheiene in the west, and as far as Seljord Municipality and Gaustatoppen in the north. The most popular trail on Hægefjell Mountain is Via Lara.

=== Hiking trails ===
Nissedal is home to a wide range of cross-country skiing trails and hiking trails, including 39 peak trails. Some of these include Havrefjell, Grønlifjell, Reinvassnuten, Skornetten, Hægefjell, and Skuggenatten in Treungen. While the trail to the mountain Havrefjell also has trailheads by Bjønntjønn Lake and Gautefall Alpine Center, the closest trail is found in the village of Felle.

A large number of trailheads are found near the lake Bjønntjønn, including trails maintained by the Norwegian Trekking Association leading to Felehovet, Mjåvassdammen, Havrefjell, and Reinvassnuten. There are also trails from Bjønntjønn to Gautefall Tourist Hotel and lakes such as Øverlandsvatnet and Østre Breivatn. The trail Heigeitilløypa, which has its trailhead at Gautefall Biathlon, leads to Jørundskårheia, Gråndalsfjell mountain, and Djupvatn Lake, before reaching the seter Holmvasstøylen by Holmvatn Lake at Kyrkjebygdheia. A dirt road leads from the lake down to the village center in Kyrkjebygda. Heigeitilløypa trail is named for the ancient boundary marker Heigeitilen.

=== Mountain biking ===
Over 100 kilometres (62 mi) of mountain bike trails are located in Nissedal. Some popular trailheads are found at Felehovet and Heimdal. The area between Heimdalsheia and Gautefallheia is particularly popular for mountain biking. In 2010, Canvas Hotel was established at Heimdal and is constructed as a Mongolian Yurt. The hotel was established for mountain bikers and is situated far into the wilderness and connected to the many biking trails. The hotel was established by Jan Fasting, the person behind the TV series 71 Degrees North. The hotel has a Maldivian dock with its own fireplace situated in the nearby lake Øytjønnane.

An additional biking trail follows the old train tracks between Treungen and Åmli.

=== Swimming ===
Lake Nisser is the lake with the most sandy beaches of any lake in Norway. Sandy beaches are found by several lakes, including Sandnesodden at Nisser, which is the longest sandy beach in Nissedal. A campground is located on this beach. Other beaches include Sommarsletta in Treungen, Haugsjåsund, Tjønnfoss, Heimdøl, Skavannsgrova, Årekrokane, Røyrodden, Åraksøya (islet), Raudnes, Sandvikland, Sauodden, Furelund, Midtvann, Sandnes, and Bjønntjønn. Tjørull is another place used for fishing, kayaking and camping. It is Nissedal's second-largest lake (only Nisser is larger).

Another attraction is the Nissedal Potholes (Jettegrytene). Carved during the Ice Age, the giant's kettle functions as a water park during summer months. The potholes are located at Eikhom and is a tourist destination during summers. The area is used for picnicking, swimming, and there are areas to slide down the riverbed as well as mountain ledges suited for jumping. After the river here was dammed for the production of power, the potholes were revealed and have since been a popular bathing destination.

== Places of interest ==
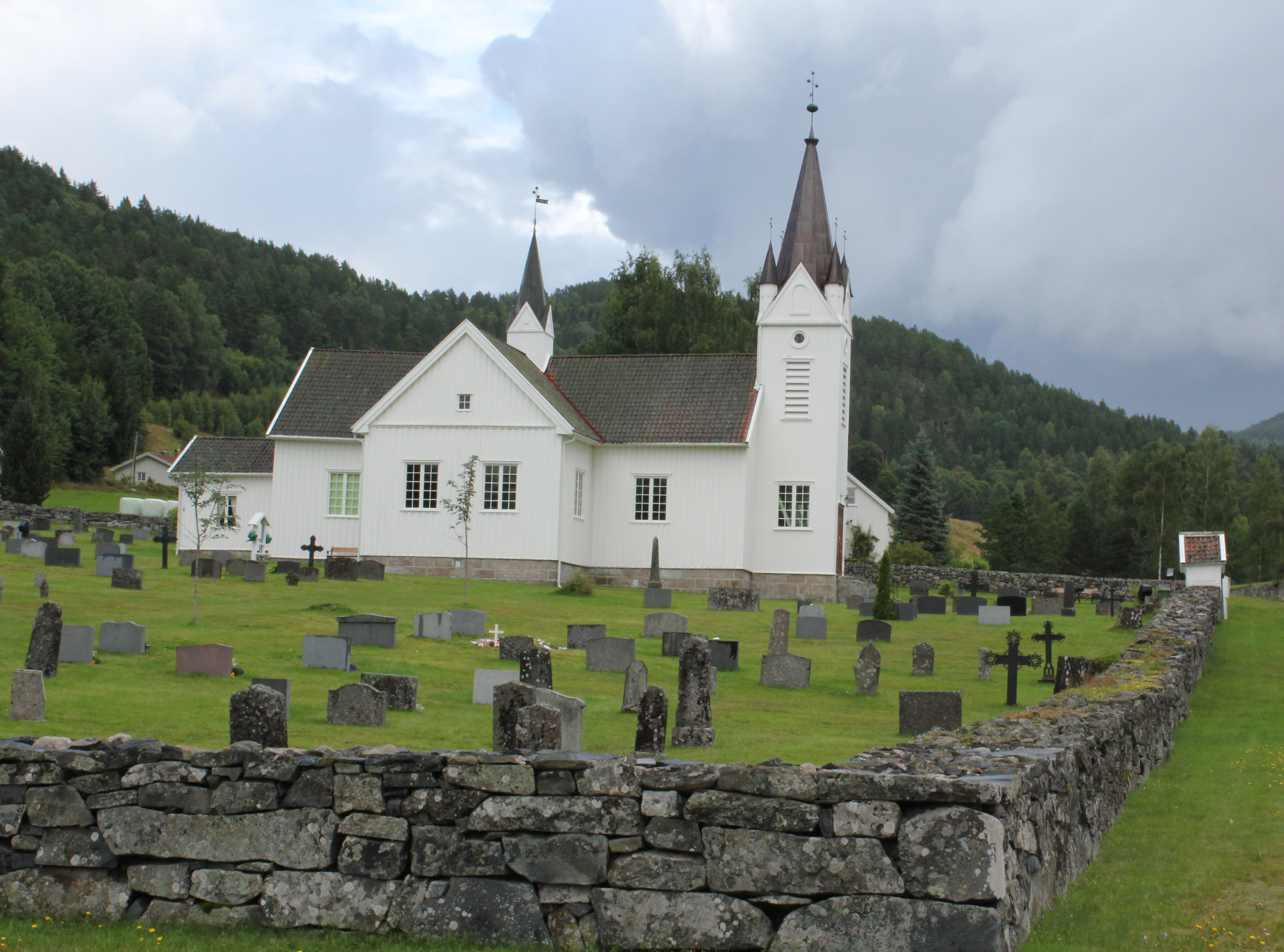
Nissedal Church was erected in 1764.

- Gautefall, largest ski resort in Telemark County.
- Nisser Lake, 7th-largest lake in Norway.
- Treungen, village and administrative center for Nissedal.
- Nissedal Potholes, potholes functioning as a water park during summer.
- Fjoneferja, Norway's smallest cable ferry, connecting the west- and east sides of Nisser Lake.
- Skuggenatten, mountain peak and Treungen landmark. It is one of Nissedal's most visited mountains.
- Hægefjell, 1021 meter (3350 ft.) high mountain with fifty hiking trails. One of Norway's most popular sites for mountain climbing. Featured in the TV series 71 Degrees North.
- Heimdalsheia, the site with the largest continuous slopes of naked rocks (svaberg) in Northern Europe.
- Kvithamar and Trontveit, ancient rock paintings by Lake Nisser.

== Wildlife ==
In 2014 two reindeer were photographed, apparently roaming in the municipality. Reindeer are often observed near Fjone.

More commonly encountered wildlife includes the Mountain hare, European badger, European beaver, Roe deer, Red deer, Elk, Red fox, European hedgehog, Wolverine, Short-tailed weasel, European otter, European pine marten and Norway lemming. More rare but occasionally encountered are the Gray wolf, Eurasian lynx and Brown bear. Avifauna includes raptors such as various species of owls, eagles, falcons, and hawks, including the Western Osprey.

Brown bears were common throughout the 1800s and early 1900s, and a number of place names derives from this, including Bjønntjønn, Bjortjønn, Bjørnåsen, Bjønndalsåsen, Bjønndalane, Bjorvatnet, and Bjønnsteinen. The last bear to be shot in Tørdal was by Bjønnsteinen in February 1911. Olav Tverrstøyl of Åmli Municipality shot a total of eight bears at Horgevika. The last bear to be shot in this area was by Landtaksdammen in 1920 by Jon Kraakenes of Vrådal. The last certified observation of bears in Nissedal happened in the summer of 2000 at Lauvlunden. The last documented person to be killed by bear in Nissedal was Hæge Kyrkjebø in July 1832.

A felling license is required by the municipality for wildlife such as Moose, Red deer, Roe deer, and Mountain reindeer. Hunting is particularly popular among Nissedal's southern border with Gjerstad Municipality where small game, deer and beavers are regularly hunted. Rabbit hunting is common in Ljosvassteigen on the border with Gjerstad Municipality and Vegårshei Municipality. Gjerstadskogene by Solhomfjell is a popular destination for those hunting birds, rabbits, beavers, and deer.

== Notable people ==
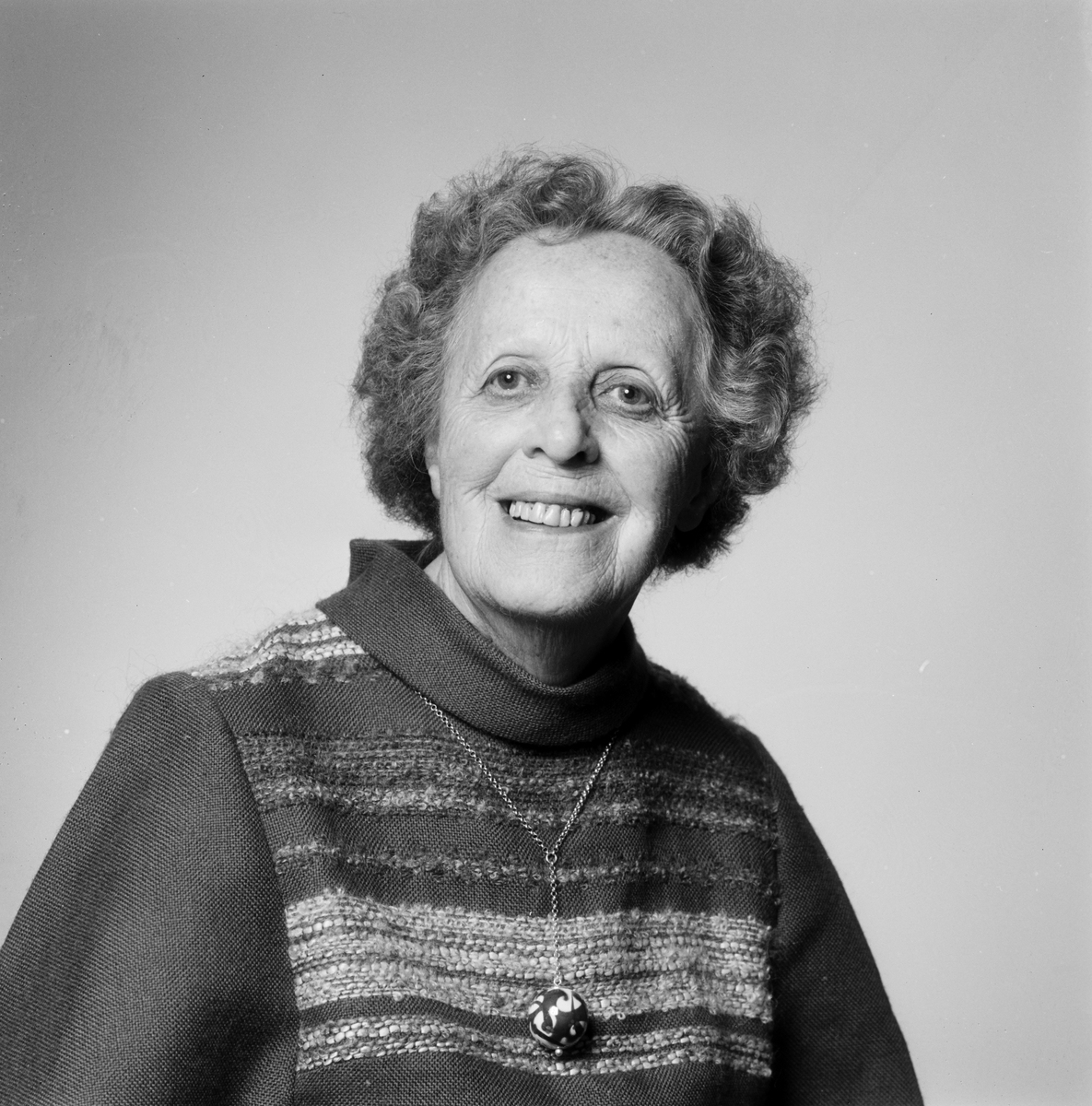
Dagny Tande Lid, 1979

- Jacob Gløersen (1852-1912), a painter of unsentimental images of Norwegian peasants
- Paul Tjøstolsen Sunde (1896-1958), a parliamentarian from the Labour Party from 1945-1953
- Torkell Tande (1901-2001), a priest/provost, parliamentarian for the Liberal Party 1954-1969
- Dagny Tande Lid (1903-1998), a painter, illustrator, and poet
- Johannes Setekleiv (1927-2017), a medical researcher, professor (neuropharmacology) at University of Oslo (UiO)
- Eldrid Nordbø (born 1942), a parliamentarian, Minister of Trade and Shipping from 1990–91
- Sigvald Oppebøen Hansen (born 1950), a parliamentarian for the Labour Party from 1993-2013
