= Kyrkjebygda, Telemark =

Village in Nissedal, Norway

Kyrkjebygda Kyrkjebygdi Nissedal
- Village
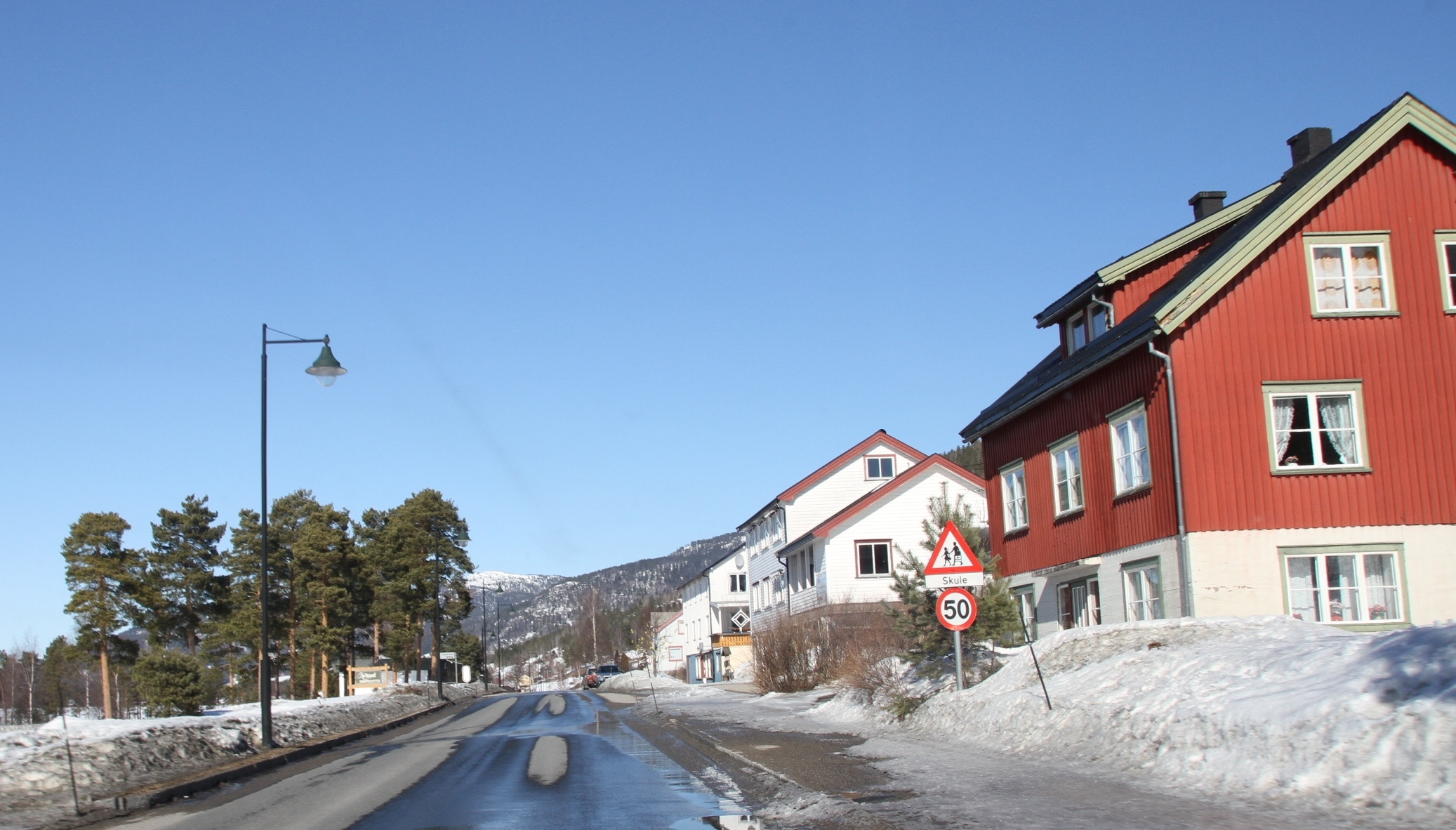
- View of the village
- Interactive map of Kyrkjebygda
- Coordinates: 59.16037°N 8.53531°E
- Country: Norway
- Region: Eastern Norway
- County: Telemark
- District: Vest-Telemark
- Municipality: Nissedal Municipality
- Elevation: 395 m (1,296 ft)
- Time zone: UTC+01:00 (CET)
  - Summer (DST): UTC+02:00 (CEST)
- Post Code: 3854 Nissedal

Kyrkjebygda is a village in Nissedal Municipality in Telemark county, Norway. The village is located on the eastern shore of the lake Nisser, about 18 kilometres (11 mi) to the north of the municipal centre of Treungen.

The meaning of the name is literally "the church village" since the Nissedal Church has been located there for centuries.

There is a small cable ferry located about 2 kilometres (1.2 mi) to the north of the village which connects the east and west sides of the large lake Nisser.
