= Nisser =

Lake in Telemark, Norway

- Nisservatnet (unofficial)
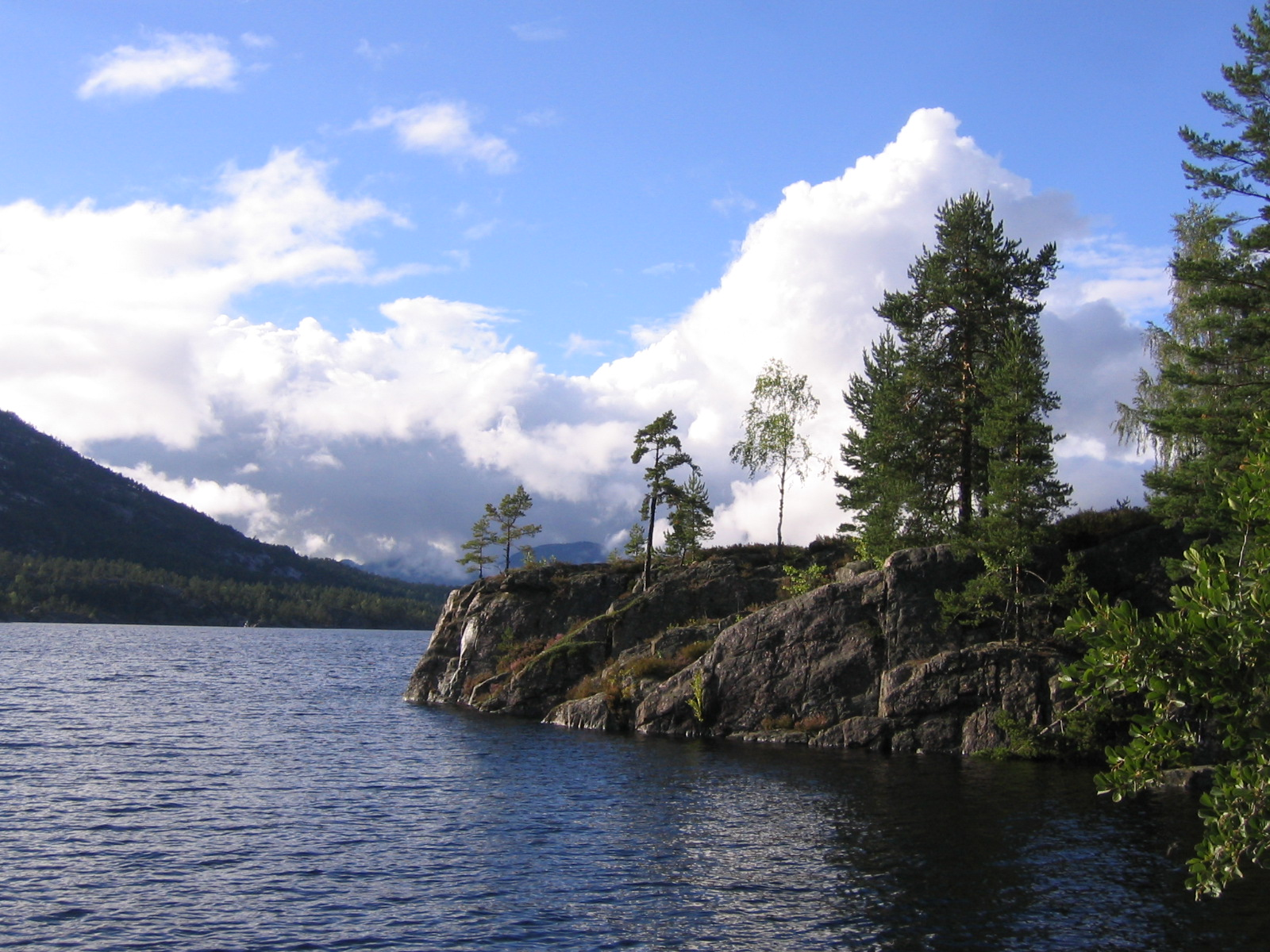
- Along the shore of Nisser
- Interactive map of Nisser
- Location: Nissedal Municipality, Telemark
- Coordinates: 59.15204°N 8.49042°E
- Type: glacier lake
- Primary inflows: Borstadåi, Frostdøl, Horgevikåi, Håtveitåi, Lindefjellåi, Nordbøåna and Roholdtåi (Straumen)
- Primary outflows: Nisserelva
- Catchment area: 1,077.7 km^{2} (416.1 sq mi)
- Basin countries: Norway
- Max. length: 35 km (22 mi)
- Max. width: 3.5 km (2.2 mi)
- Surface area: 76.07 km^{2} (29.37 sq mi)
- Average depth: 93 m (305 ft)
- Max. depth: 234 m (768 ft)
- Water volume: 7.074 km^{3} (1.697 cu mi)
- Surface elevation: 247 m (810 ft)
- Islands: Trontveitøya
- References: NVE

Nisser is a lake in Telemark county, Norway. It is located in Nissedal Municipality and Kviteseid Municipality. This is Telemark's largest lake and also the 10th-largest lake by area in Norway, with a surface area of 76.07 km^{2} (29.37 sq mi) (when artificial lakes are excluded). It's also the 8th largest lake by volume at 7.074 km^{3} (1.697 cu mi). It is also the 16th deepest lake at 234 m (768 ft). Nisser has the greatest average depth of the Norwegian lakes that is not a cryptodepression. Its entire lake basin is located above sea level. As part of the Arendal watershed, water enters this lake from the discharge from the nearby lake Vråvatn, and its outlet is the Nisserelva river which later becomes part of the river Nidelva.

Fish species in the lake include the Brown trout, European whitefish, European perch, Stickleback, and Arctic char.

== History ==
In 1914, a canal was constructed between Nisser, which is 246 m (807 ft) above sea level, and the nearby lake Vråvatn, which is 248 m (814 ft) above sea level. This makes it possible to travel the 50 km (31 mi) long stretch from Tveitsund to Vråliosen by boat.

=== Name ===
The lake is named Nisser or sometimes Nisservatnet (Old Norse: Nizir or Niðsær). The first element is the name of the local river Nið, the old name for the river Nidelva. The last element is sær which means "inland sea" or "large lake". Thus it is "the inland sea that feeds the river Nidelva".

== Geography ==
The 35-kilometre (22 mi) long lake has several villages located along its shores including Treungen at the southern end, Kyrkjebygda about mid-way along the lake on the eastern shore, and the village of Eidstod (in Kviteseid Municipality at the northern tip of the lake. The Norwegian National Road 41 runs along the whole eastern side of the lake. The Fjone ferry (M/F Nissen), which connects the west and east sides of the lake, is the last operating cable ferry in Norway.

The widest part of the lake is found immediately south of Lauvlunduten, which is situated on the border between Nissedal Municipality and Kviteseid Municipality. This is also a location where the lake resembles the sea as one cannot see across the lake to the other side at this location. The largest island in the lake is Trontveitøya. Several vacation homes are located on the island.

== Media gallery ==
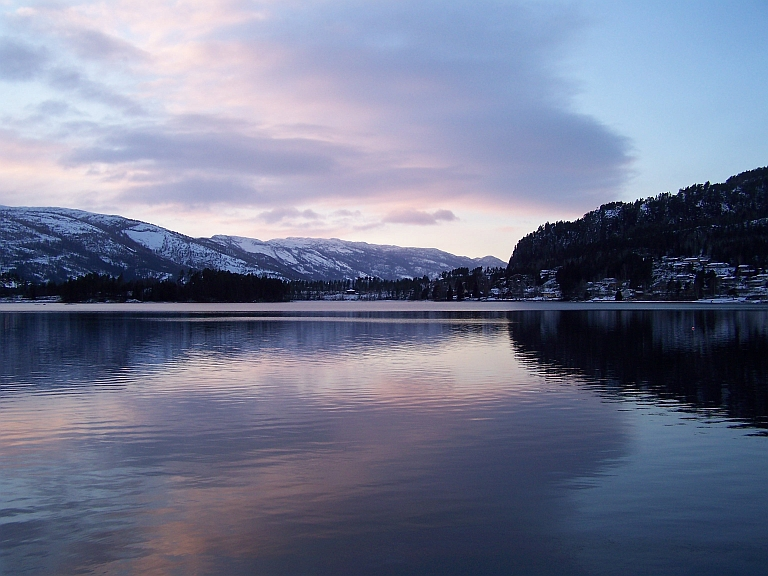

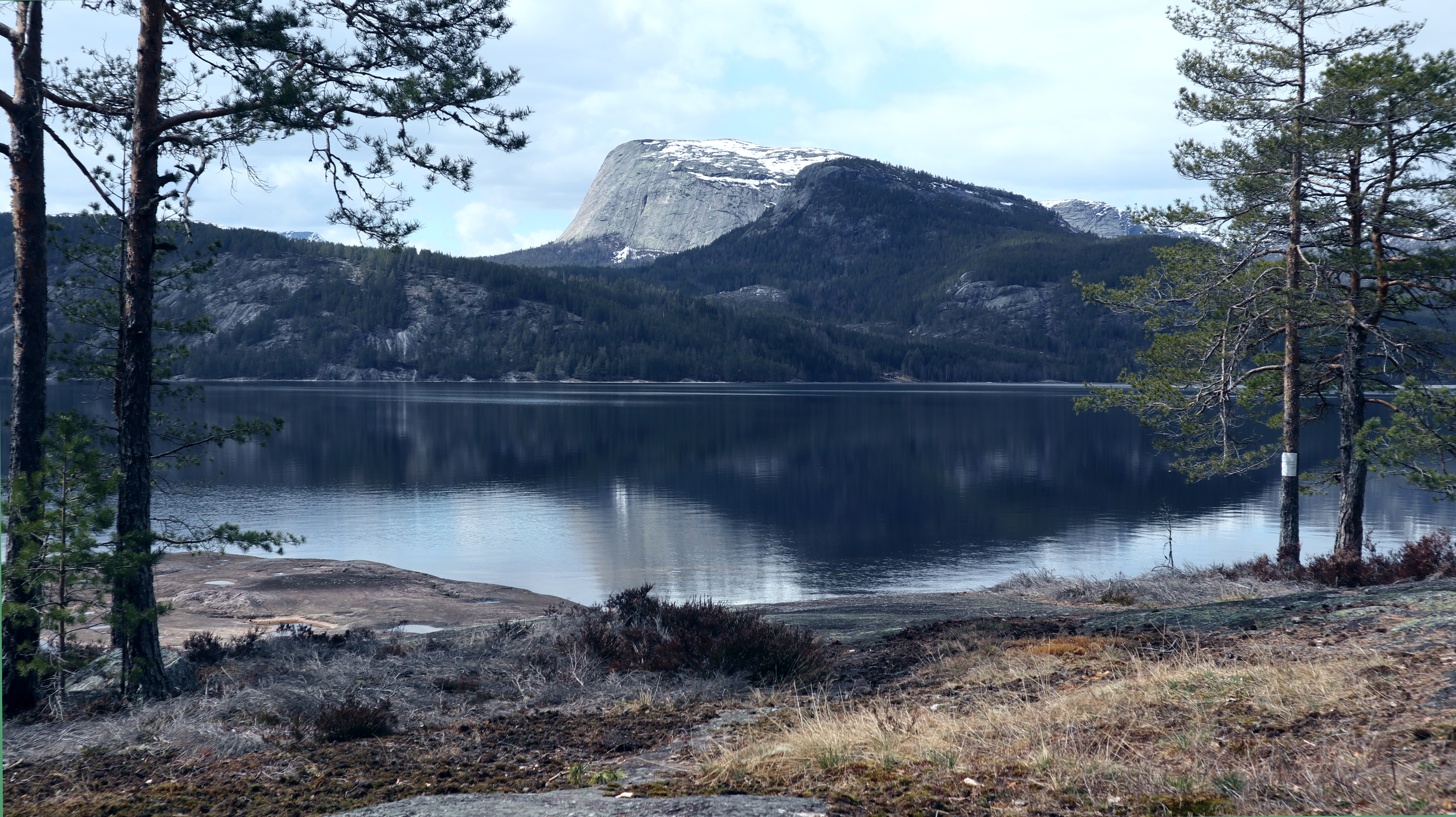

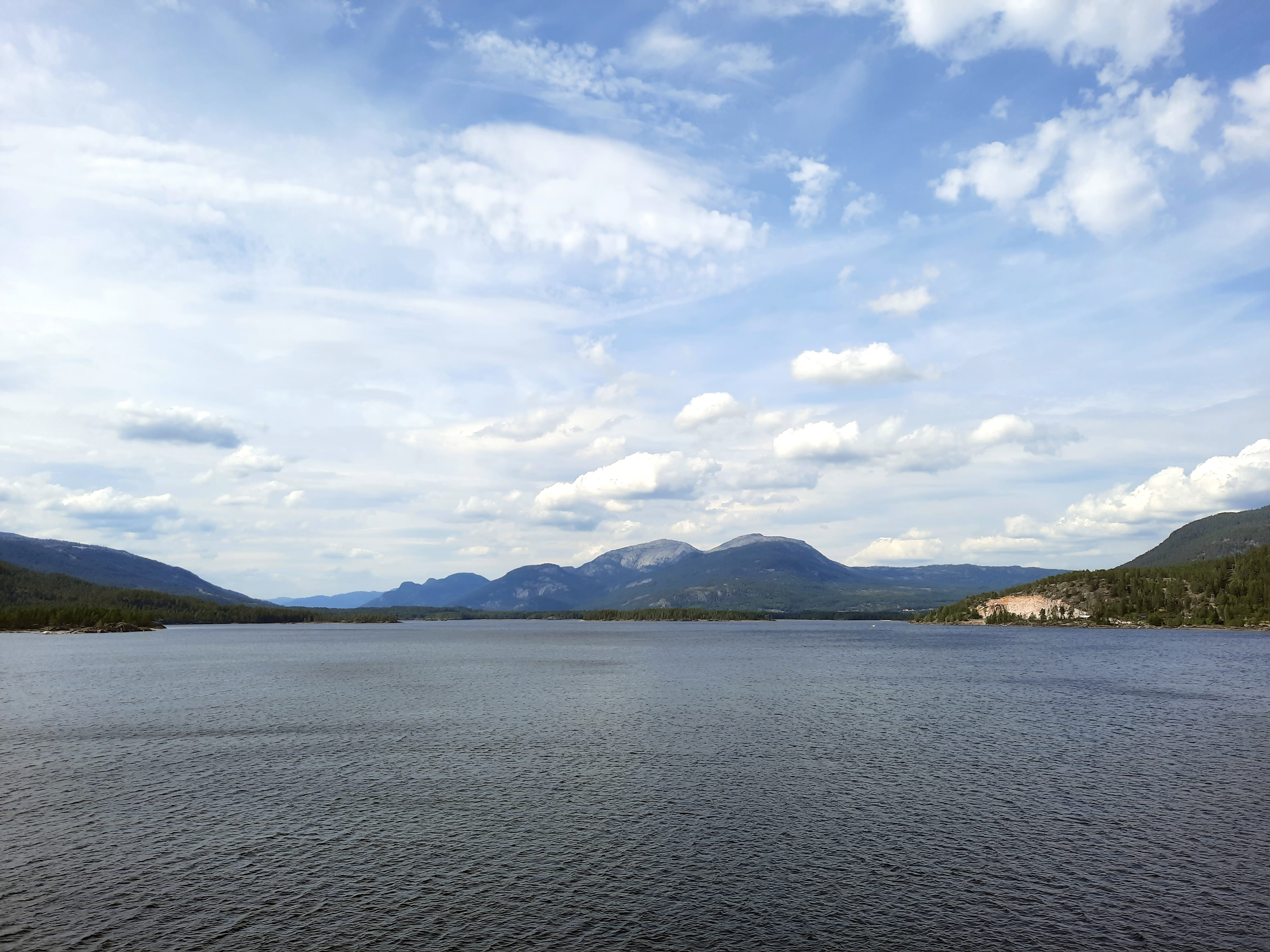

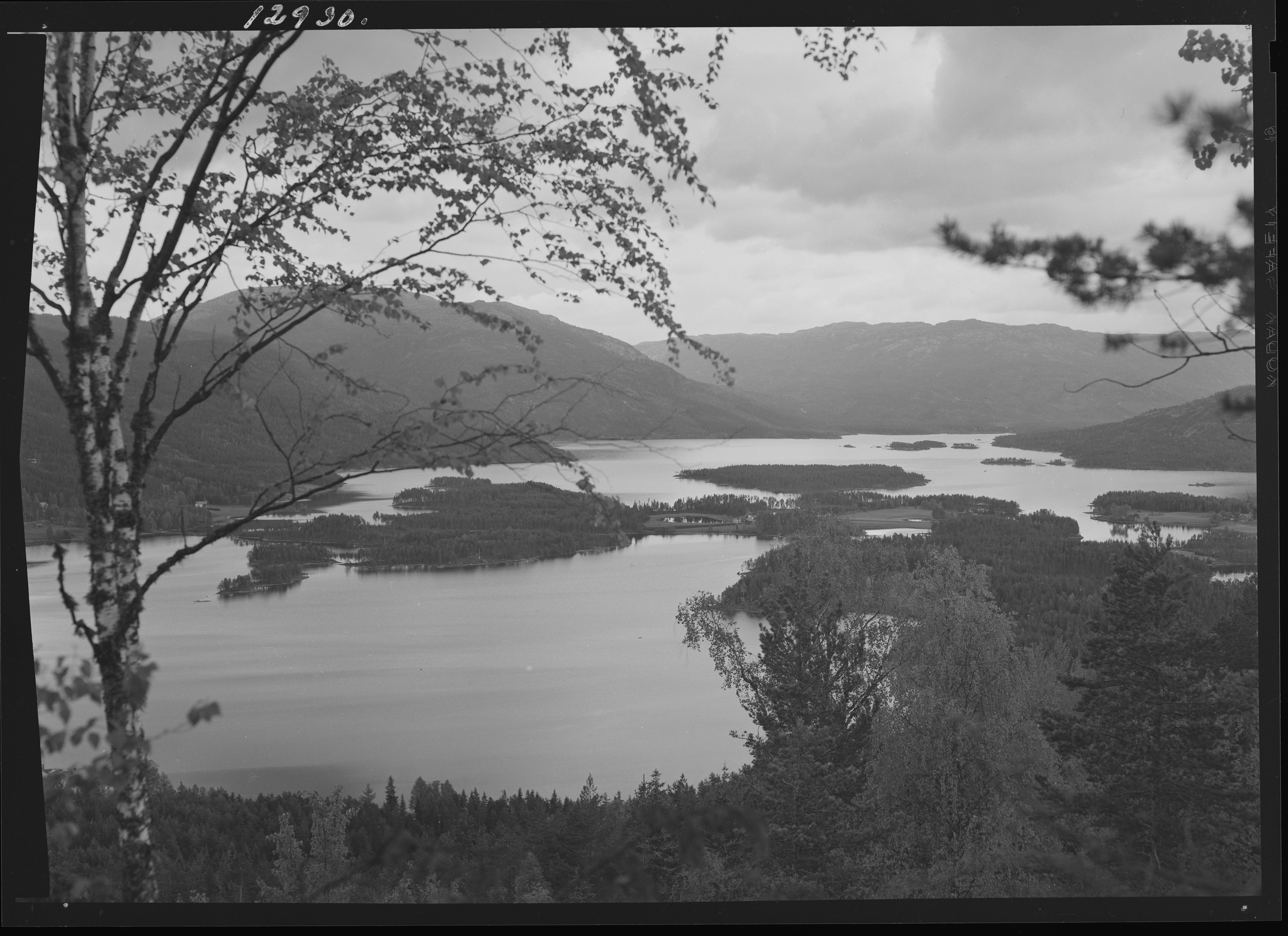

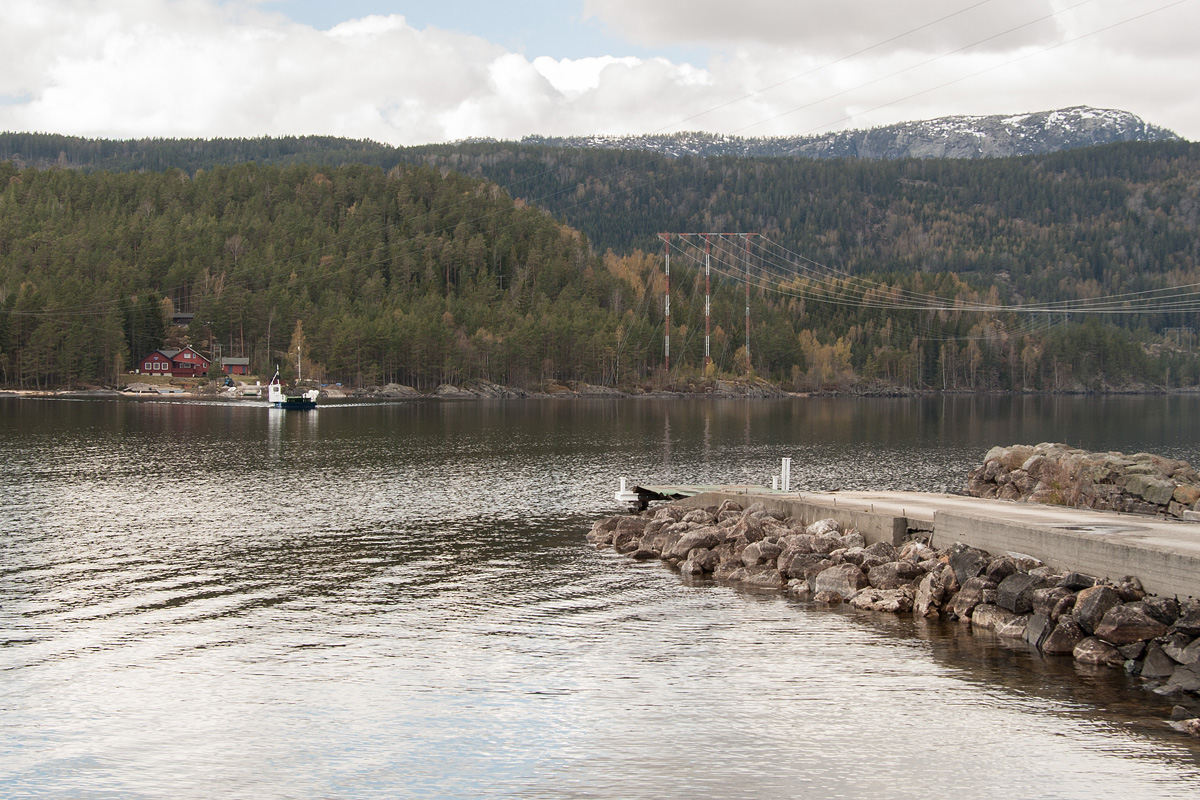
Ferry across the lake

== See also ==
- List of lakes in Norway
