= List of villages in Telemark =

This is a list of villages in Telemark, a county of Norway. Villages which are the administrative centers of their municipality are highlighted in blue and marked with this symbol (†) on this list. The term "villages" refers includes settlements, hamlets, and farm areas in Telemark county. The list excludes cities/towns located in Telemark. For other counties see the lists of villages in Norway.

Place	Coordinates	Postal Code	Municipality
Akkerhaugen	59°23′42″N 9°15′05″E	3812	Midt-Telemark
Arabygdi	59°46′31″N 7°43′42″E	3864	Vinje
Atrå	59°59′17″N 8°44′07″E	3656	Tinn
Austbygde (Tinn Austbygd)	59°59′44″N 8°49′42″E	3650	Tinn
Austad	59°14′37″N 9°47′08″E	3748	Siljan
Austbø	59°41′36″N 8°06′22″E	3864	Vinje
Bamble	59°00′44″N 9°33′26″E	3960	Bamble
Berdal	59°32′04″N 7°56′54″E	3890	Vinje
Bergane	59°12′55″N 8°46′15″E	3753	Drangedal
Bjervamoen	59°17′54″N 9°06′21″E	3825	Nome
Bjønnes	59°03′10″N 9°46′18″E	3949	Porsgrunn
Bjørkedalen	59°08′48″N 9°44′01″E	3948	Porsgrunn
Bolkesjø	59°43′29″N 9°16′37″E	3680	Notodden
Bondal	59°48′56″N 8°36′19″E	3697	Hjartdal
Bostrak	59°06′27″N 8°53′24″E	3750	Drangedal
Botten	58°58′17″N 9°33′45″E	3960	Bamble
Brevikstranda	58°58′33″N 9°39′32″E	3960	Bamble
Brunkeberg	59°26′05″N 8°28′59″E	3850	Kviteseid
Brøsjø	58°55′33″N 9°06′18″E	3760	Drangedal
Busnesgrenda	59°48′59″N 8°59′10″E	3691	Notodden
Bø i Telemark (†)	59°24′47″N 9°04′09″E	3800	Midt-Telemark
Bø	59°09′14″N 8°48′44″E	3753	Drangedal
Bøgrend	59°36′34″N 7°53′39″E	3890	Vinje
Børte	59°22′07″N 9°03′48″E	3825	Nome
Dalen (†)	59°26′42″N 8°00′18″E	3880	Tokke
Døvika	59°06′19″N 9°43′17″E	3949	Porsgrunn
Edland	59°44′17″N 7°36′13″E	3895	Vinje
Eidanger	59°07′07″N 9°41′53″E	3946	Porsgrunn
Eidsborg	59°27′52″N 8°01′19″E	3880	Tokke
Eidstod	59°19′31″N 8°28′44″E	3853	Kviteseid
Eikjabygda	59°22′54″N 9°01′47″E	3800	Midt-Telemark
Felle	58°54′13″N 8°44′38″E	4865	Nissedal
Flakvarp	59°07′29″N 9°35′22″E	3739	Skien
Flåbygd	59°19′13″N 8°59′09″E	3825	Nome
Fjågesund	59°18′11″N 8°41′39″E	3850	Kviteseid
Flatdal	59°34′04″N 8°34′01″E	3841	Seljord
Folkestad	59°26′09″N 9°04′11″E	3800	Midt-Telemark
Frøystaul	59°49′48″N 8°20′42″E	3660	Tinn
Gausetbygde	60°03′03″N 8°44′09″E	3656	Tinn
Gautefall	59°04′22″N 8°44′56″E	3750	Drangedal
Gjerde	58°55′41″N 9°19′09″E	3766	Kragerø
Gonsholt	59°15′18″N 9°46′05″E	3748	Siljan
Gransherad	59°41′26″N 9°02′18″E	3691	Notodden
Grorud	59°23′56″N 9°42′35″E	3748	Siljan
Grunge	59°42′50″N 7°45′37″E	3895	Vinje
Grønvollfoss	59°39′23″N 9°12′32″E	3680	Notodden
Gvarv	59°23′16″N 9°10′21″E	3810	Midt-Telemark
Hauggrend	59°19′14″N 8°08′21″E	3870	Fyresdal
Haugland	59°26′36″N 8°29′43″E	3850	Kviteseid
Haugsjåsund	58°56′39″N 8°30′20″E	3855	Nissedal
Haukeli	59°44′05″N 7°33′06″E	3895	Vinje
Heddal	59°35′15″N 9°10′20″E	3677	Notodden
Heimdal	59°00′10″N 8°34′25″E	3855	Nissedal
Heistad	59°04′40″N 9°41′17″E	3941	Porsgrunn
Helgja	59°15′19″N 9°21′33″E	3830	Nome
Helle	58°54′13″N 9°23′26″E	3790	Kragerø
Henneseid	59°03′43″N 9°11′54″E	3750	Drangedal
Herre	59°06′13″N 9°33′43″E	3965	Bamble
Hjartdal	59°36′03″N 8°39′11″E	3690	Hjartdal
Hjuksebø	59°29′32″N 9°20′02″E	3683	Notodden
Hjuksevelta	59°30′32″N 9°19′15″E	3683	Notodden
Holtsås	59°27′25″N 9°20′22″E	3683	Midt-Telemark
Hoppestad	59°15′23″N 9°33′50″E	3721	Skien
Hovin	59°51′09″N 9°01′43″E	3652	Tinn
Hørte	59°25′18″N 9°07′51″E	3800	Midt-Telemark
Høydalsmo/Ofte	59°29′58″N 8°11′51″E	3891	Tokke
Jomfruland	58°51′23″N 9°34′28″E	3781	Kragerø
Jønnevall	59°16′20″N 9°34′04″E	3721	Skien
Kil	58°53′26″N 9°18′06″E	3766	Kragerø
Kilegrend	59°00′33″N 8°16′28″E	3870	Fyresdal
Kilen	59°20′29″N 8°47′24″E	3840	Kviteseid
Klovholt	59°11′03″N 9°31′48″E	3729	Skien
Krossen (Midtbygdi)	59°41′41″N 8°03′47″E	3864	Vinje
Krossli	59°21′49″N 8°09′15″E	3849	Tokke
Kviteseid (†)	59°24′08″N 8°29′34″E	3850	Kviteseid
Kvitsund	59°22′58″N 8°31′15″E	3850	Kviteseid
Kvålsgrendi	59°29′33″N 8°15′23″E	3891	Tokke
Kyrkjebygda	59°09′37″N 8°32′07″E	3854	Nissedal
Landsmarka	59°14′46″N 9°09′39″E	3825	Nome
Landsverk	59°36′46″N 9°16′14″E	3680	Notodden
Langangen	59°05′16″N 9°48′17″E	3947	Porsgrunn
Langlim	59°35′15″N 8°22′39″E	3841	Seljord
Levang	58°47′30″N 9°22′21″E	3788	Kragerø
Lognvik	59°40′32″N 8°10′33″E	3864	Vinje
Luksefjell	59°24′00″N 9°32′05″E	3721	Skien
Lårdal	59°25′27″N 8°11′10″E	3891	Tokke
Mannåsgrend	59°33′14″N 7°58′25″E	3890	Vinje
Miland	59°55′30″N 8°45′13″E	3658	Tinn
Mo	59°29′02″N 7°50′24″E	3880	Tokke
Moland (Fyresdal) (†)	59°11′00″N 8°05′32″E	3870	Fyresdal
Morgedal	59°28′38″N 8°25′07″E	3848	Kviteseid
Melum	59°12′37″N 9°25′01″E	3729	Skien
Møsstrond	59°51′08″N 8°03′55″E	3864	Vinje
Nesland (north)	59°41′03″N 8°01′47″E	3864	Vinje
Nesland (south)	59°31′26″N 7°59′09″E	3890	Vinje
Neslandsvatn	58°58′17″N 9°09′23″E	3760	Drangedal
Nesodden	59°22′24″N 9°13′12″E	3810	Midt-Telemark
Nordagutu	59°24′59″N 9°19′26″E	3820	Midt-Telemark
Nordbygdi	59°11′54″N 8°30′44″E	3854	Nissedal
Nordbøåsane	59°24′14″N 9°01′22″E	3803	Midt-Telemark
Oklungen	59°10′33″N 9°48′34″E	3948	Porsgrunn
Opdalen	59°18′54″N 9°39′25″E	3748	Siljan
Portør	58°48′21″N 9°25′58″E	3788	Kragerø
Prestestranda (†)	59°05′51″N 9°03′32″E	3750	Drangedal
Rambekk	59°07′56″N 9°31′11″E	3739	Skien
Raulandsgrend	59°42′59″N 7°59′18″E	3864	Vinje
Rognsbru	59°06′44″N 9°26′01″E	3739	Skien
Rognstranda	59°00′21″N 9°42′06″E	3960	Bamble
Rudsgrendi	59°51′01″N 8°56′32″E	3691	Notodden
Sandnes	59°19′06″N 9°14′24″E	3830	Nome
Sandøya	59°02′55″N 9°43′45″E	3950	Porsgrunn
Sauland (†)	59°37′08″N 8°55′54″E	3692	Hjartdal
Sauherad	59°25′18″N 9°17′03″E	3812	Midt-Telemark
Seljord (†)	59°29′05″N 8°37′49″E	3840	Seljord
Siljan (†)	59°17′16″N 9°42′23″E	3748	Siljan
Skafså	59°24′17″N 8°00′17″E	3880	Tokke
Skotfoss	59°12′54″N 9°31′28″E	3720	Skien
Skreosen	59°21′05″N 8°08′40″E	3849	Kviteseid
Smørklepp	59°38′31″N 7°48′03″E	3893	Vinje
Sneltvedt	59°13′20″N 9°38′21″E	3719	Skien
Snurråsen	59°17′28″N 9°42′46″E	3748	Siljan
Stabbestad	58°50′58″N 9°24′05″E	3788	Kragerø
Surtebogen	59°03′43″N 9°37′30″E	3960	Bamble
Svartdal	59°35′17″N 8°33′10″E	3841	Seljord
Svelgfoss	59°35′48″N 9°16′15″E	3680	Notodden
Svenseid	59°20′09″N 9°05′20″E	3825	Nome
Særendsgrend	59°35′18″N 7°55′04″E	3890	Vinje
Tinnoset	59°43′29″N 9°01′38″E	3691	Notodden
Treungen (†)	59°01′14″N 8°31′13″E	3855	Nissedal
Tuddal	59°45′12″N 8°47′47″E	3697	Hjartdal
Tveitsund	59°01′01″N 8°31′30″E	3855	Nissedal
Tåtøy	58°51′25″N 9°22′51″E	3770	Kragerø
Ulefoss (†)	59°16′57″N 9°15′56″E	3830	Nome
Vadfoss	58°53′31″N 9°20′42″E	3770	Kragerø
Valebø	59°18′46″N 9°19′55″E	3721	Skien
Valle	58°56′03″N 9°33′09″E	3960	Bamble
Vinjastranda	58°59′42″N 9°40′01″E	3960	Bamble
Vinje	59°37′10″N 7°50′35″E	3890	Vinje
Vinjesvingen	59°37′21″N 7°48′43″E	3893	Vinje
Viperud	59°35′54″N 9°07′33″E	3677	Notodden
Vrådal	59°19′40″N 8°25′00″E	3853	Kviteseid
Vråliosen	59°21′48″N 8°10′14″E	3849	Kviteseid
Vågsli	59°46′03″N 7°22′02″E	3895	Vinje
Yli	59°33′41″N 9°11′38″E	3677	Notodden
Ytre Byrte	59°32′39″N 7°48′55″E	3880	Tokke
Ørvella (west)	59°36′10″N 9°00′42″E	3692	Hjartdal
Ørvella (east)	59°36′25″N 9°01′15″E	3677	Notodden
Øvre Birtedalen	59°03′35″N 7°57′55″E	3870	Fyresdal
Øvre Byrte	59°33′35″N 7°48′43″E	3880	Tokke
Øyane	59°17′04″N 8°05′23″E	3870	Fyresdal
Øyfjell	59°34′25″N 8°11′11″E	3890	Vinje
Åfoss	59°11′52″N 9°32′13″E	3731	Skien
Åmdals Verk	59°22′34″N 8°02′11″E	3882	Tokke
Åmot	59°36′34″N 8°25′31″E	3841	Seljord
Åmot (†)	59°34′11″N 7°59′19″E	3890	Vinje
Åmotsdal	59°37′47″N 8°24′20″E	3841	Seljord
Åsgrendi	59°26′30″N 8°34′27″E	3850	Kviteseid
