= Fyresdal =

Fyresdal may refer to:

== Places ==
- Fyresdal Municipality, a municipality in Telemark county, Norway
- Fyresdal (village), a village within Fyresdal Municipality in Telemark county, Norway
- Fyresdal prestegjeld, a former geographic subdivision within the Church of Norway

== Other ==
- Fyresdal IL, a sports club based in Fyresdal Municipality in Telemark county, Norway
- Fyresdal Airport, or Vest-Telemark Airport, Fyresdal, an airport within Fyresdal Municipality in Telemark county, Norway
