= Veum Church =

Church in Telemark, Norway

- Veum kyrkje
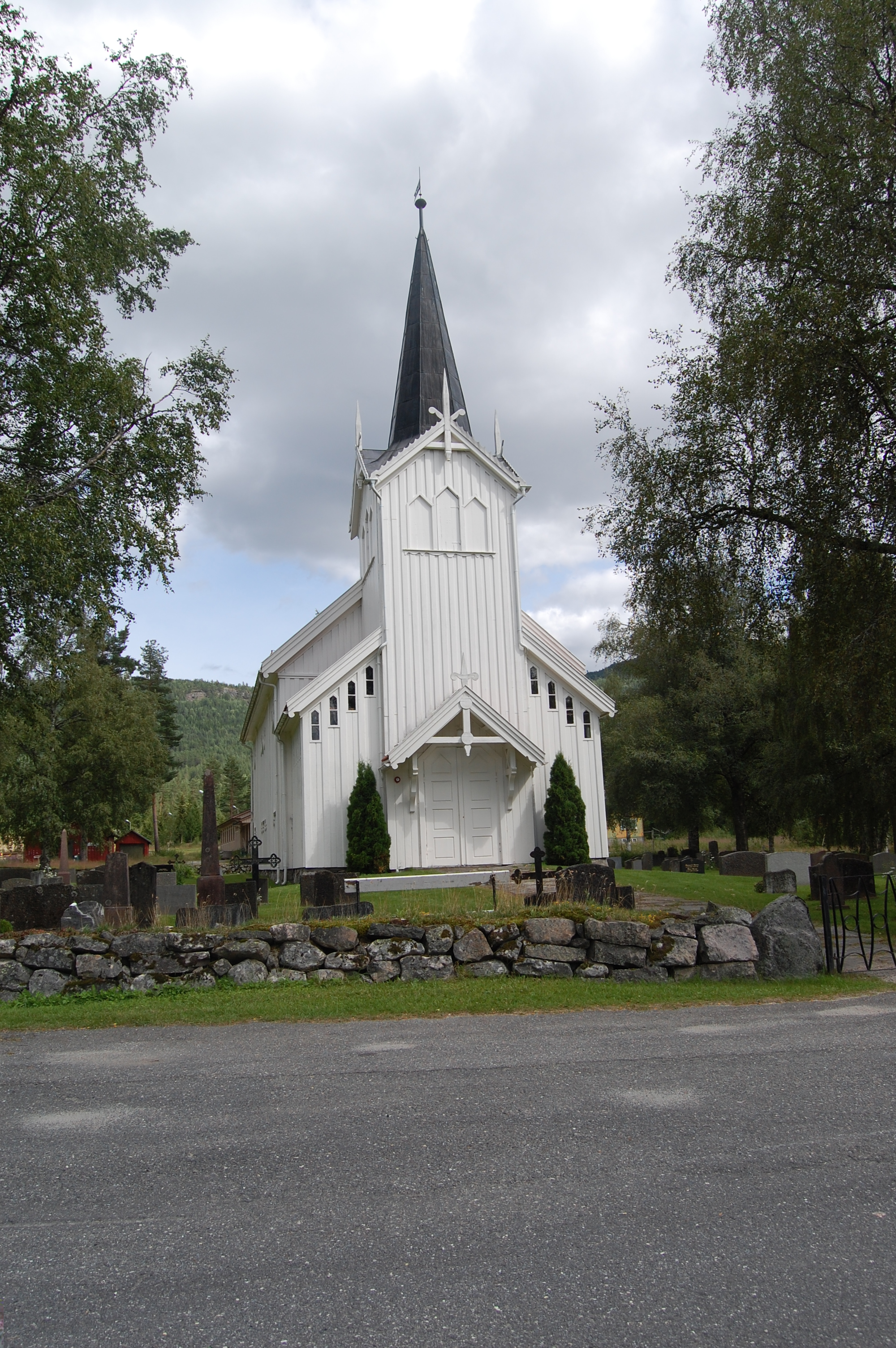
- View of the church
- Veum Church
- 59°17′07″N 8°05′33″E
- Location: Fyresdal Municipality, Telemark
- Country: Norway
- Denomination: Church of Norway
- Previous denomination: Catholic Church
- Churchmanship: Evangelical Lutheran

History
- Status: Parish church
- Founded: c. 1300
- Consecrated: 14 August 1863

Architecture
- Functional status: Active
- Architect: Christian Grosch
- Architectural type: Long church
- Completed: 1863 (163 years ago)

Specifications
- Capacity: 180
- Materials: Wood

Administration
- Diocese: Agder og Telemark bispedømme
- Deanery: Øvre Telemark prosti
- Parish: Fyresdal
- Norwegian Cultural Heritage Site
- Type: Church
- Status: Listed
- ID: 135974

Veum Church (Norwegian: Veum kyrkje) is a parish church of the Church of Norway in Fyresdal Municipality in Telemark county, Norway. It is located in the village of Øyane. It is one of the two churches for the Fyresdal parish which is part of the Øvre Telemark prosti (deanery) in the Diocese of Agder og Telemark. The white, wooden church was built in a long church design in 1863 using plans drawn up by the architect Christian Grosch. The church seats about 180 people.

== History ==
The earliest existing historical records of the church date back to the year 1483, but the first church was likely built around the year 1300. This first church was likely a wooden stave church that was located about 1.5 kilometres (0.93 mi) to the northeast of the present church site. By the end of the 17th century, this stave church was in poor condition and was in constant need of repair, so the old church was torn down and a new church was built on the same site in 1727. The new church was a small, modest, wooden long church which was described as "unsightly" in 1785.

In the mid-1800s, the old Heggland Church was closed and its people were divided between the two nearby churches: Veum Church and Moland Church. The current Veum Church (at that time) was too small and would need significant renovations and repairs to accommodate the newly enlarged parish. Also, a new main road through the village of Øyane was built around the same time, so it was decided to build a new, larger church in the village, along the new main road. The parish underwent some difficult times around 1850 and there was some strong opposition to moving the church, so there were delays. Thus, the new church wasn't built until 1863. This new wooden long church was based on a standard architectural drawing by Christian Grosch and it was built by a builder named Svenkesen. The new church was consecrated on 14 August 1863. After the new building was completed, the old church was torn down. The new church originally had a rose window over the front door, but it eventually fell into disrepair and was removed. The church was restored in 1957.

== Media gallery ==
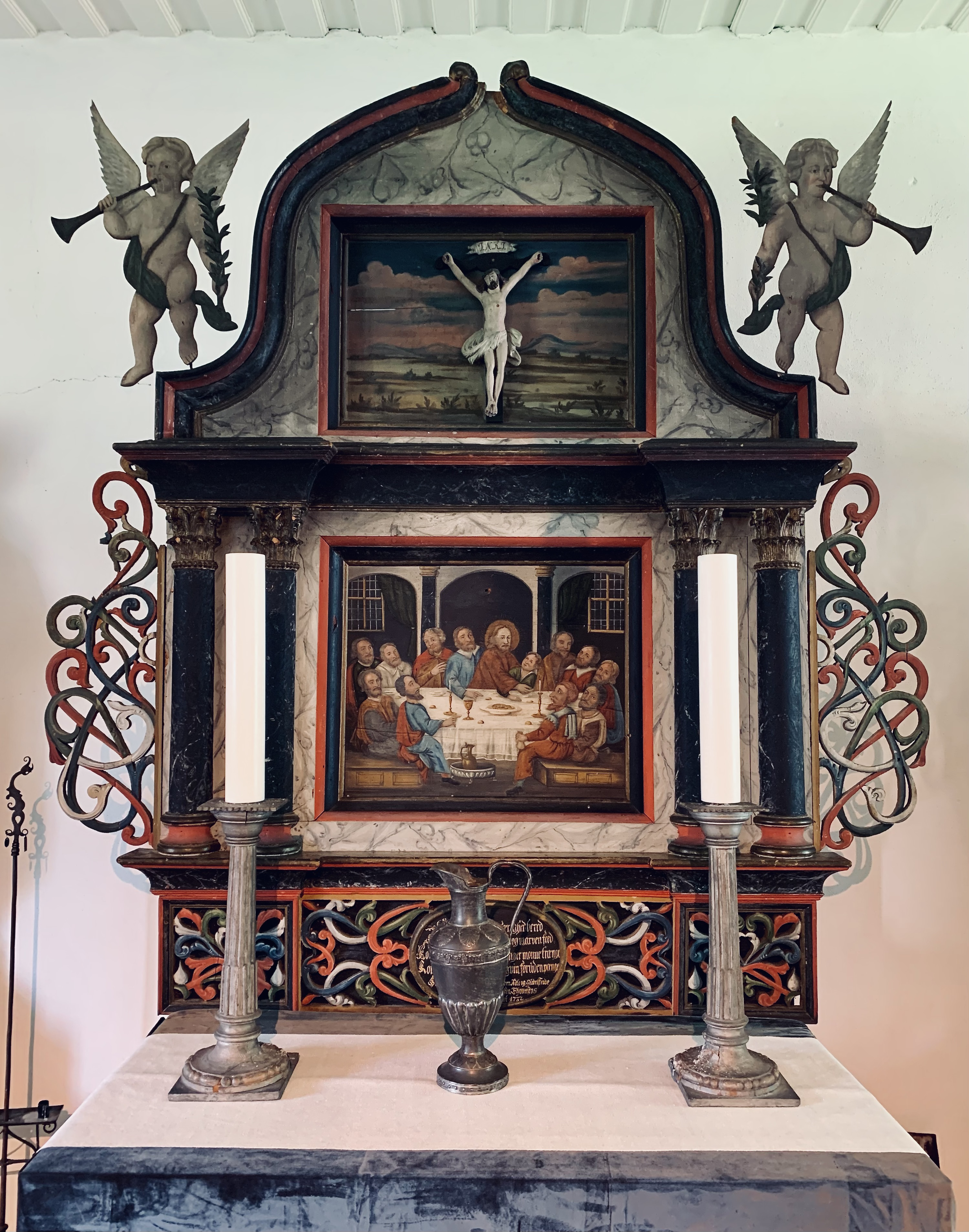
Altar table

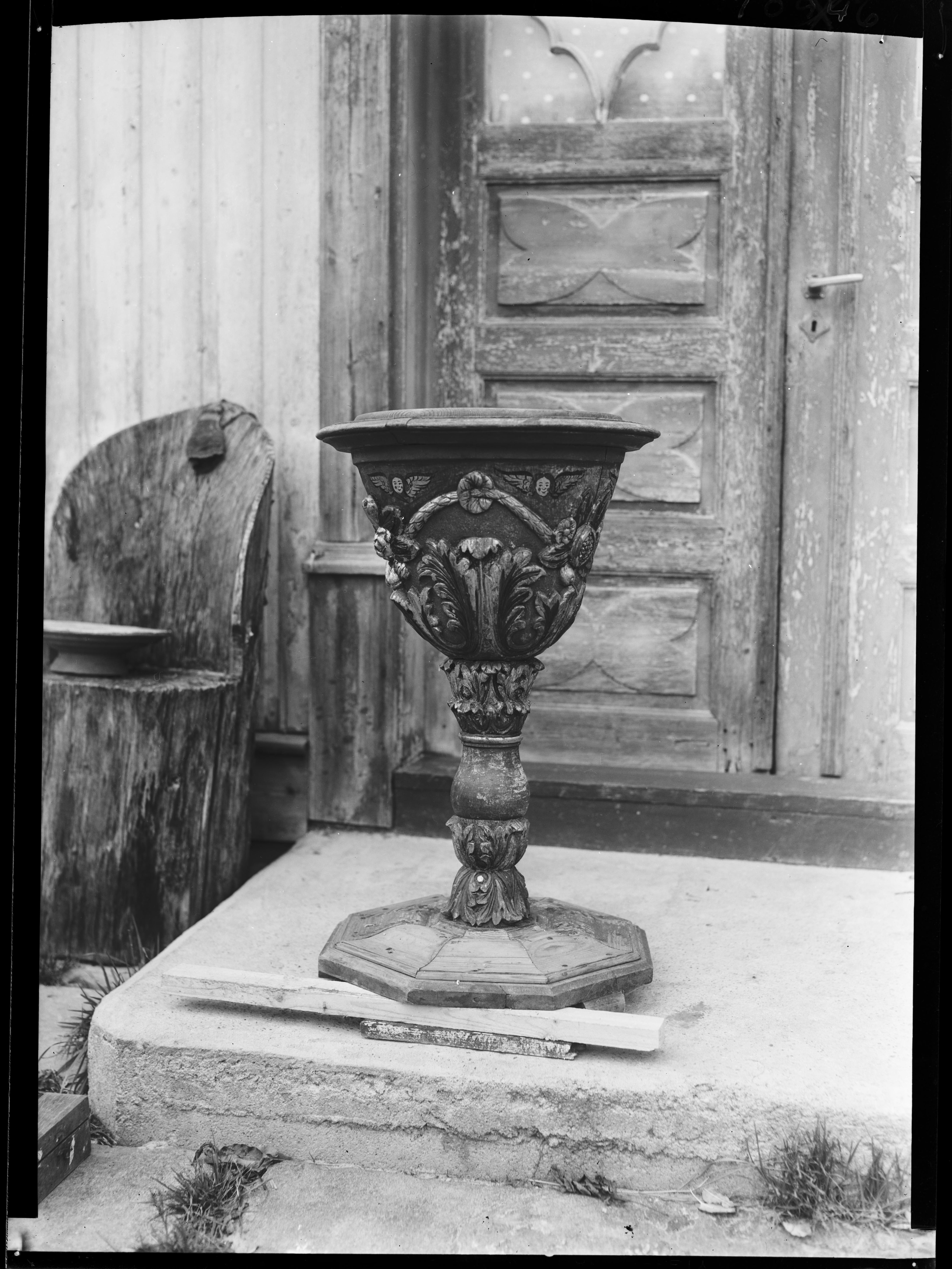
Baptismal font

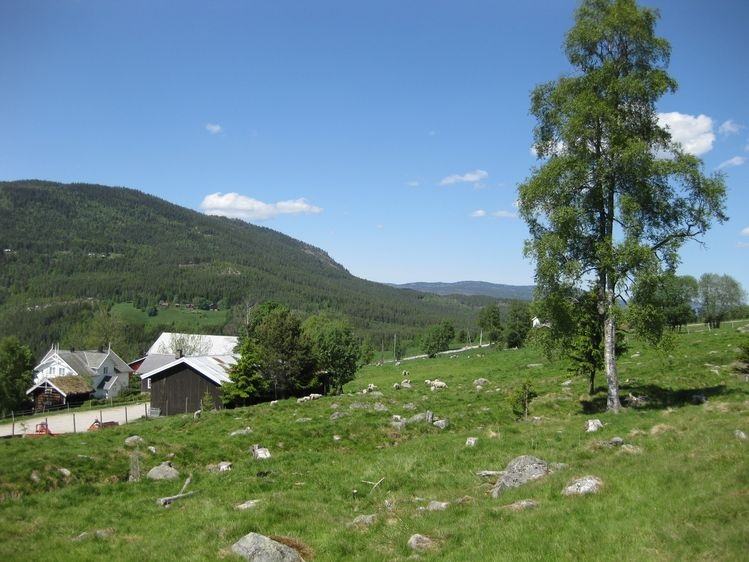
Site of the old church

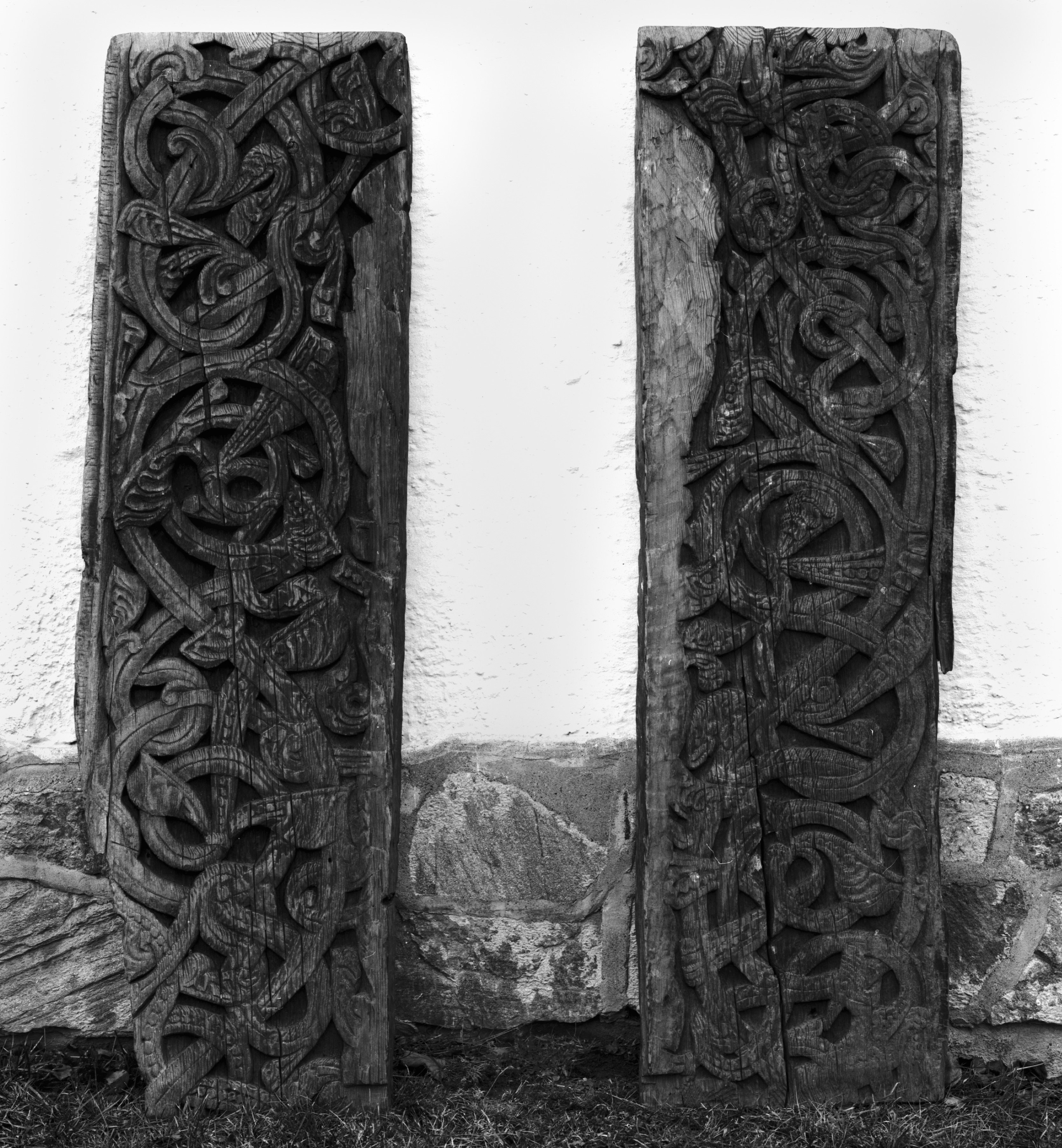
Portal from the old church

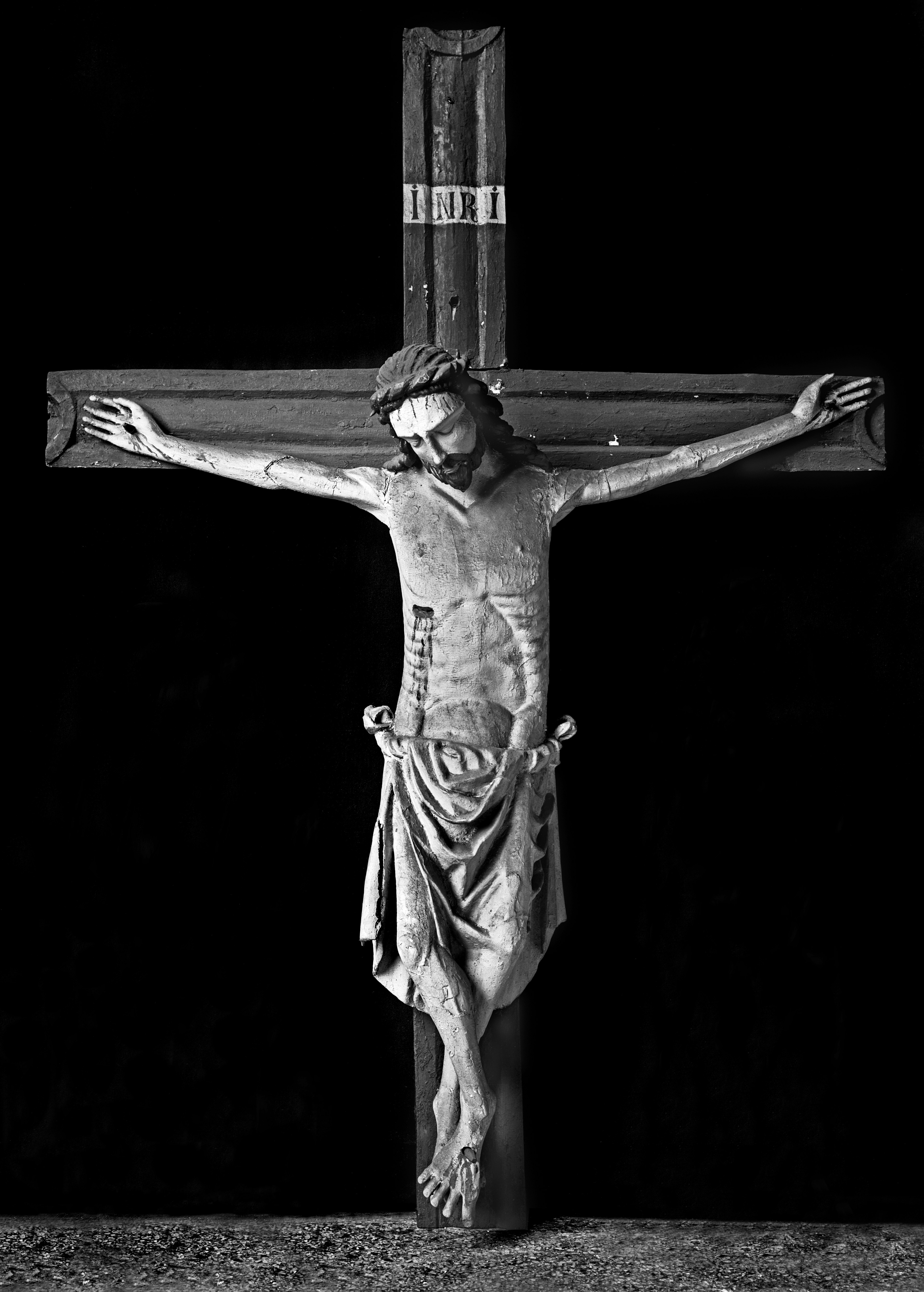
Crucifix from the old church

== See also ==
- List of churches in Agder og Telemark
