= Øyane (disambiguation) =

Øyane may refer to:

- Øyane, a neighborhood in the city of Stavanger in Rogaland county, Norway
- Øyane, Telemark, a village in Fyresdal municipality in Telemark county, Norway
- Søre Øyane, a village in Bjørnafjorden municipality in Vestland county, Norway
