= Håkon Lie =

Håkon Lie can refer to:

- Haakon Lie (1905–2009), Norwegian politician
- Håkon Wium Lie (born 1965), Norwegian technologist
- Haakon Lie (forester) (1884–1970), Norwegian forester and writer
