= Sigmund Groven =

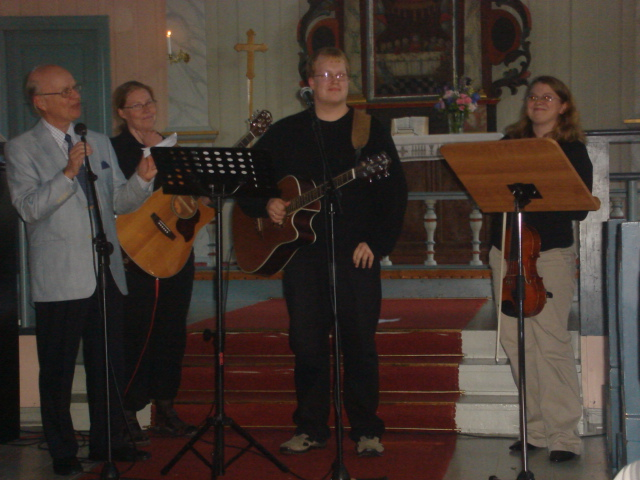
- Groven to the left with Sugar Plum Fairies at Moland Church in Fyresdal Municipality, August 3, 2007.

Background information
- Born: 16 March 1946 (age 80)
- Origin: Norway
- Genres: Classical, traditional folk music
- Occupations: Musician, composer
- Instrument: Harmonica
- Website: www.sigmundgroven.com

Sigmund Groven (born 16 March 1946 in Heddal Municipality, Telemark) is a Norwegian classical harmonica player, today considered one of the world's leading classical harmonica players. He plays with a large number of the world's leading musicians and orchestras, and he has made 23 recordings yet in his own name (compilations not counted). His repertoire ranges from popular and folk music to his own compositions, from Bach to contemporary music.

== Influences and early career ==
Groven grew up in a family with rich music and cultural traditions. His uncle was the folk musician and composer, Eivind Groven (1901–77). As a child, he heard Tommy Reilly playing harmonica on radio, and was fascinated by what he heard. From 1960, Groven studied with Reilly in London, in 1965 he performed as a solo artist for the first time, and has since often been seen and heard on TV and radio. Groven has worked as a music producer, radio presenter, programme producer for radio and as a music teacher, at Norwegian universities and at master-classes around the world.

In 1971 Groven presented his first original composition; the music to Erik Bye's poem, "Så spiller vi harmonica", and he continued to work with Erik Bye on a number of songs and projects.

== Collaborations, soundtracks, main works ==
Groven has contributed to over 250 recordings, and has written more than 350 original compositions, from children's songs and instrumental ballads to movie and TV soundtracks, and works on a larger scale. He has written music to lyrics and poems by Ove Røsbak, Halvor J. Sandsdalen, Tarjei Vesaas, Olav Kaste, Hans Børli, Josef G.Larssen and Erik Bye. Composers who have written music especially for Groven include Hui Cheung Wai, Øistein Sommerfeldt, Terje Rypdal, James Moody, Johan Kvandal, Oddvar S. Kvam, Ketil Bjørnstad, Kristian Lindeman, Henning Sommerro, Iver Kleive, Egil Kapstad, Kenneth Sivertsen, Johan Øian, John Surman, Siegfried Steinkogler, Lars Tilling, and Fried Walter.

Soundtracks include the films "For Tors skyld" and "Fuglekongen", and the TV documentary series "Vi på Langedrag".

Many of Groven's recordings have become part of the Norwegian cultural heritage. Reodors ballade (by Bent Fabricius-Bjerre) from the movie "Flåklypa Grand Prix", "Svalbard theme" by Bøhren & Åserud, and a version of Henning Sommero's "Vårsøg" are among the instrumental classics of Norwegian music, loved by several generations.

Groven has recorded 23 albums ranging from original music via Beatles hits to classical works. His albums are sold worldwide and he enjoys great popularity in Asia. Groven has toured all over the world with solo recitals from New York (Carnegie Hall) to Tokyo (Casals Hall). In 2002 he became the first harmonica-player to appear as soloist with the Mozarteum Orchestra in Salzburg giving the world premiere of Siegfried Steinkogler's Harmonica Concerto, and has performed with symphony and chamber orchestras in the US, Canada, Europe and Asia, including Academy of St. Martin in the Fields, the radio orchestras of Berlin, Munich, Brussels, Stockholm and London, the Hong Kong City Chamber Orchestra and orchestras in Quebec, Dallas, Minneapolis and Anchorage. He has been featured at festivals and major events in Washington (Smithsonian Institution), Los Angeles, San Francisco, Minneapolis, Dallas, Houston, New Orleans, Toronto, most major cities in western Europe as well as Budapest, Belgrade, Athens, also Riydah, Jeddah, Hong Kong, Taipei, Seoul, Kyoto, Singapore and Yokohama.

== Teaching ==
For more than 30 years Groven has been teaching at the annual summer courses organized by the Norwegian Harmonica Association. He has also been teaching at the Trondheim Conservatory of Music and has given master-classes both in Europe, North America, and several Asian countries.

Since August 2018, Sigmund Groven is harmonica teacher at the Norwegian Academy of Music in Oslo.

== Solo and collaborative discography (original titles) ==
- 1975: Så spiller vi harmonica
- 1976: Music for two Harmonicas (with Tommy Reilly)
- 1977: Musikk for en lang natt (with Ketil Bjørnstad)
- 1979: Motlys
- 1981: Musikken inni oss (with Arve Tellefsen)
- 1981: Kom sol på alle mine berg (with Geirr Lystrup)
- 1981: Lævandes dikt (with Ove Røsbak, Iver Kleive)
- 1983: Songar utan ord (with Henning Sommerro)
- 1986: Colour Slides
- 1988: Aria
- 1988: Sigmund Groven (compilation)
- 1990: Nordisk natt
- 1991: Nattønsker (compilation)
- 1993: Siesta
- 1995: Til Telemark
- 1996: I godt lag (compilation)
- 1998: Harmonica Album
- 2000: Innunder jul (with Iver Kleive, Anne Vada)
- 2001: Vi på Langedrag (TV documentary soundtrack)
- 2003: Over the Rainbow
- 2004: Here, There and Everywhere (with The Norwegian Radio Orchestra under the direction of John Wilson)
- 2005: PhilHarmonica (with The Norwegian Radio Orchestra under the direction of Christian Eggen)
- 2007: Grieg Album (with Ivar Anton Waagaard, Kåre Nordstoga, and The Norwegian Radio Orchestra under the direction of Peter Szilvay)
- 2010: HarmOrgan (with Iver Kleive)
- 2012: Classical Harmonica
- 2014: Sigmund Groven Collection vol. 1: Harmonica Hits (compilation)
- 2015: Sigmund Groven Collection vol. 2: Tradition (compilation)
- 2016: Sigmund Groven Collection vol. 3: Concerto (compilation)
- 2018: Bønn for drømmen
- 2019: Songs for harmonica
- 2020: The sound of Telemark (with Knut Buen)
- 2021: In Concert (compilation)
- 2023: Kjenslevev (with Knut Buen)

There are three recordings with the Norwegian Radio Orchestra. The first is an album featuring works for harmonica and orchestra by Sir George Martin, as well as his arrangements of Lennon–McCartney songs and other shorter pieces. The second is followed by PhilHarmonica, a CD of serious original works by Darius Milhaud, Heitor Villa-Lobos and Scandinavian contemporary composers. The third is an album of adaptions of the music of Edvard Grieg.

"HarmOrgan" together with organist Iver Kleive is an album of baroque works by Bach and Handel, plus original pieces by Groven and Kleive recorded in Surround Sound on Blu-ray format by Lindberg Lyd and released on the prestigious 2L label.

Groven plays a custom-made Polle silver concert harmonica.

== Awards ==
- 1984: Musical work of the year from NOPA for several works
- 1986: Heddal Bank's award
- 1990: Musical work of the year from NOPA for Prestegangaren and Tårån i troppene
- 1991: Honorary citizen of Texas state
- 1994: The Kardemumme scholarship
- 1995: The annual Cultural Award from Telemark county
- 1996: The Gammleng award
- 2002: Honorary member of NOPA
- 2004: City of Oslo's scholarship
- 2006: The Storegut award
- 2009: Klaus Egge Memorial Award
- 2010: Lifetime annual honorary grant from the Norwegian government
- 2012: Guangzhou Music Award (China)
- 2015: The Royal Norwegian Order of St. Olav, Knight class

Awards
| Preceded by Lynni Treekrem | Recipient of the Gammleng-prisen Open class 1996 | Succeeded by Agnes Buen Garnås |
