= Fyresvatnet =

Lake in Telemark, Norway

- Fyresvatn
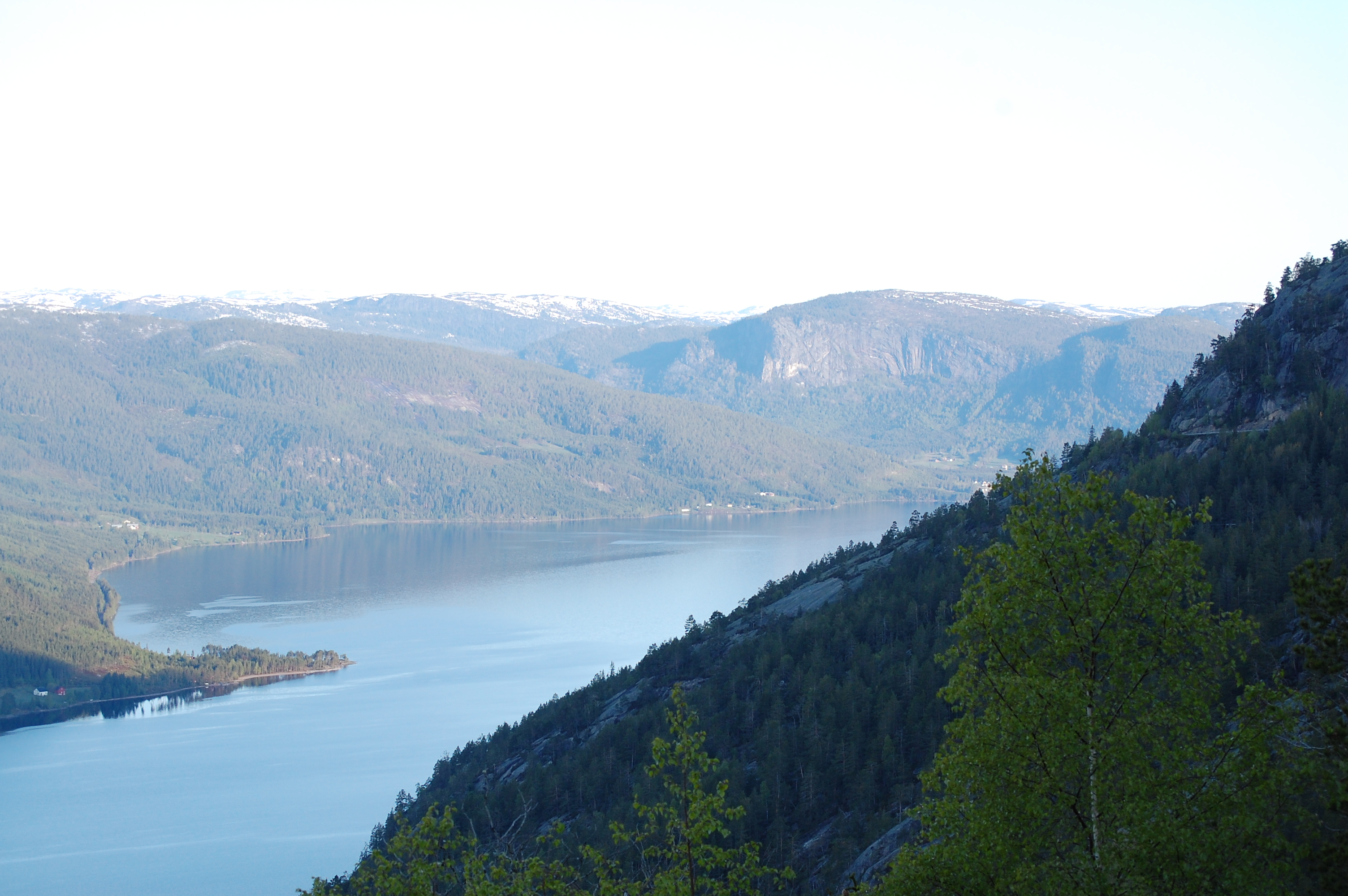
- View of the lake
- Interactive map of Fyresvatnet
- Location: Fyresdal Municipality, Telemark
- Coordinates: 59.08883°N 8.15703°E
- Type: glacial lake
- Primary inflows: Breiviksåne, Dalåni, Fardøl, Nordåi, Sitjeåi and Vikåi
- Primary outflows: Fyresdalsåna
- Catchment area: 878.7 km^{2} (339.3 sq mi)
- Basin countries: Norway
- Max. length: 25 kilometres (16 mi)
- Max. width: 2.5 kilometres (1.6 mi)
- Surface area: 49.68 km^{2} (19.18 sq mi)
- Average depth: 120 m (390 ft)
- Max. depth: 377 m (1,237 ft)
- Water volume: 5.96 km^{3} (1.43 cu mi)
- Shore length^{1}: 63.41 km (39.40 mi)
- Surface elevation: 275–280 m (902–919 ft)
- Islands: Øyne
- References: NVE
- ^{1} Shore length is not a well-defined measure.

Fyresvatnet is a lake in Fyresdal Municipality in Telemark county, Norway. With a depth of 377 metres (1,237 ft), the lake is the fifth-deepest lake in Norway. The 49.7-square-kilometre (19.2 sq mi) lake stretches about 25 kilometres (16 mi) from the village of Kilegrend in the south to Moland in the north.

At the southern end of the lake, the sides of the lake are steep and sparsely inhabited. At the north end, near Moland Church, the terrain is more open and the residential areas are more dense. This is the site of the village of Moland (the municipal centre).

Fyresvatnet belongs to the Arendal watershed, and discharges via the Fyresdalsåna river into the Nidelva river, which flows into the Skagerrak at Arendal in Agder county.

== See also ==
- List of lakes in Norway
