= Vest-Telemark Airport, Fyresdal =

Vest-Telemark Airport, Fyresdal Vest-Telemark flyplass, Fyresdal
- IATA: none; ICAO: ENFY

Summary
- Airport type: Private
- Location: Fyresdal, Norway
- Coordinates: 59°12′14″N 008°05′17″E

Map
- Location in Norway

Runways
Direction	Length		Surface
Direction	m	ft	Surface
	800	2,600	Asphalt

Vest-Telemark Airport, Fyresdal (Norwegian: Vest-Telemark flyplass, Fyresdal; ICAO: ENFY) is an airport in Fyresdal Municipality in Telemark county, Norway. It does not service commercial aircraft. Was until 2008 operated by Airparc Fyresdal and in a joint venture with a local hotel. From 2009 operated by the local aeroclub and Fyresdal Municipality. It has a declared runway length of 800 meters (2,600 ft), although the physical length is 1,400 meters (4,600 ft).

== History ==
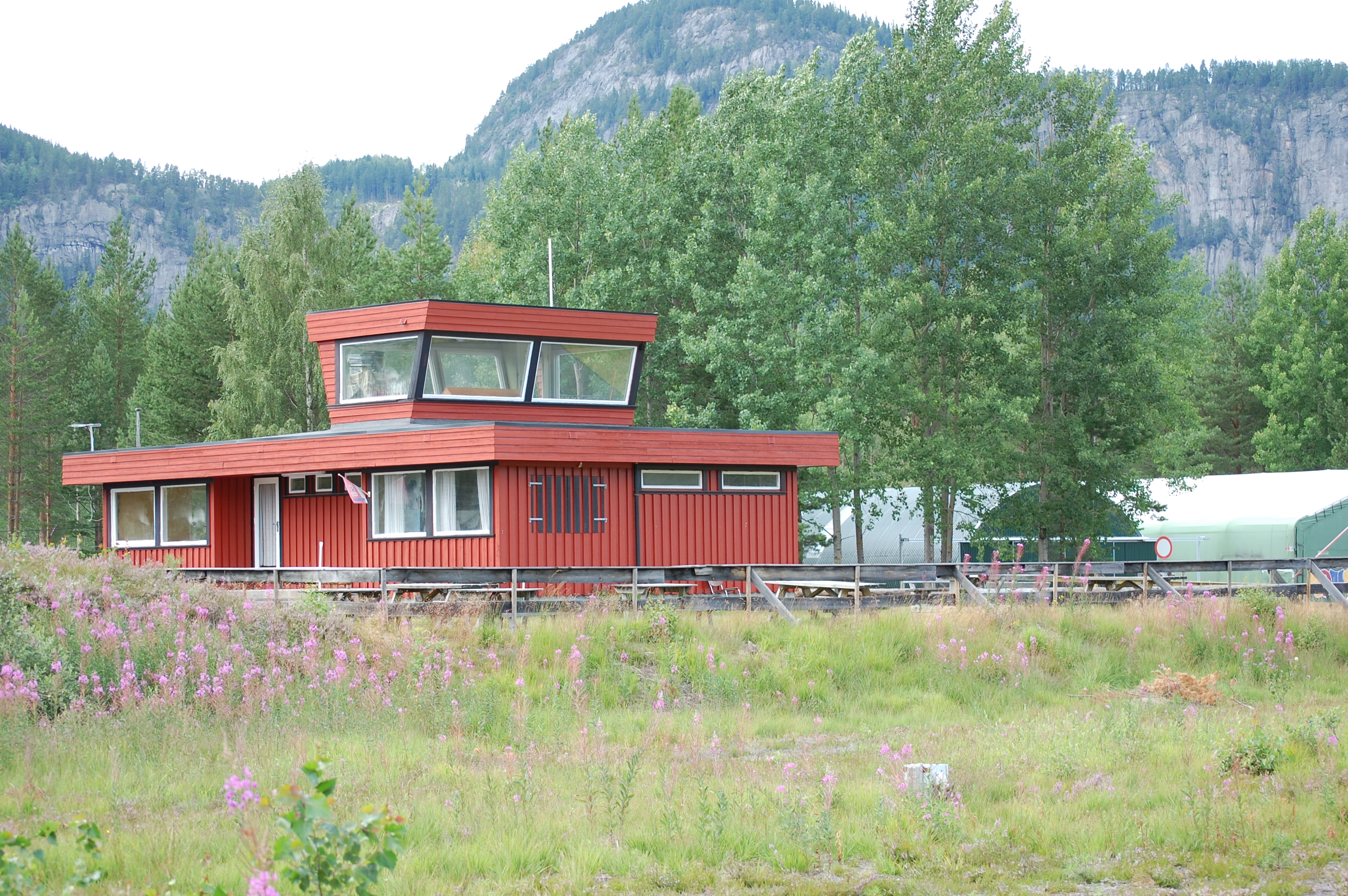
The control tower

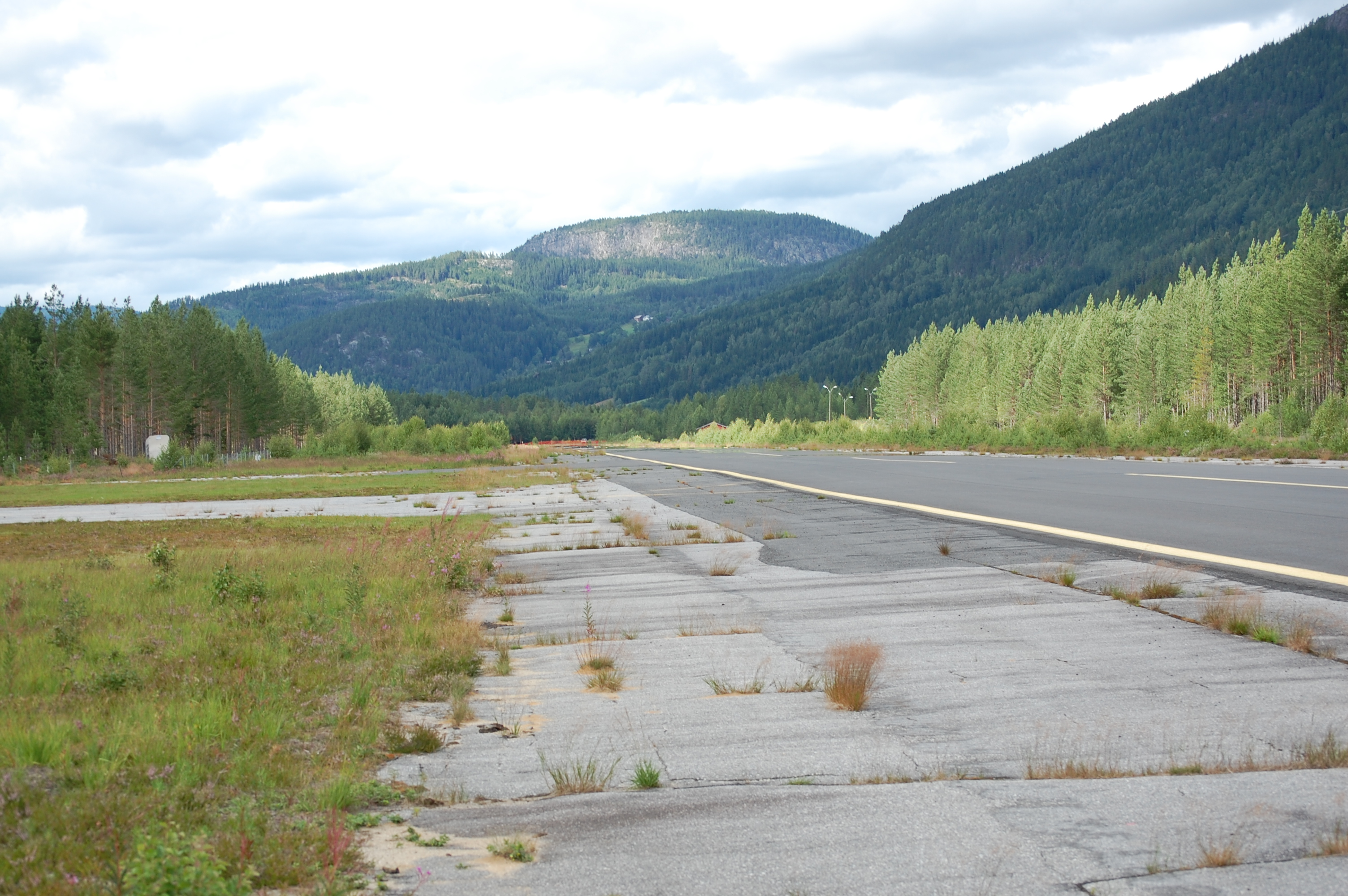
The runway

The initiative to establish an airport at Fyresdal was taken by Snorre Kjetilson and Snorre Hansen. The latter who worked for the municipality, while the former was the proprietor of Fjellfly, an airline based at Skien Airport, Geiteryggen. They saw the airport as an opportunity to attract tourism to the district and particularly aimed at English and German tourists.

The airport was opened on 23 September 1967. The following day it featured an air show with 6,000 spectators. After initial services by Fjellfly and a few flights by Cimber Air, a separate airline was started at the airport, which operated during part of the 1970s. Fyresdal Air Taxi was established by Oddvar Faane and received a Piper Cherokee. This aircraft was only operated from March through September 1973. Later the airline also bought a Cessna 180 and a Piper Aztec. There was little business out of Fyresdal and the aircraft were mostly used elsewhere.

== Bibliography ==
- Hagby, Kay (1998). Fra Nielsen & Winther til Boeing 747 (in Norwegian). Drammen: Hagby.
- Olsen, Bjørn (1999). Telemark i norsk luftfarts historie (in Norwegian). Skau. ISBN 82-7976-002-4.
