= Kilegrend =

Village in Fyresdal Municipality, Norway

- Village
- Interactive map of Kilegrend
- Coordinates: 59.00908°N 8.2744°E
- Country: Norway
- Region: Eastern Norway
- County: Telemark
- District: Vest-Telemark
- Municipality: Fyresdal Municipality
- Elevation: 282 m (925 ft)
- Time zone: UTC+01:00 (CET)
  - Summer (DST): UTC+02:00 (CEST)
- Post Code: 3870 Fyresdal

Kilegrend is a village in Fyresdal Municipality in Telemark county, Norway. The village is located at the southern end of the lake Fyresvatnet, about 25 kilometres (16 mi) south of the municipal centre of Moland. The village lies in the far southern part of the municipality, near the border with Nissedal Municipality. There was a school in Kilegrend until the 1990s when it was closed.
