= Sugar Plum Fairies =

Norwegian folk/pop band

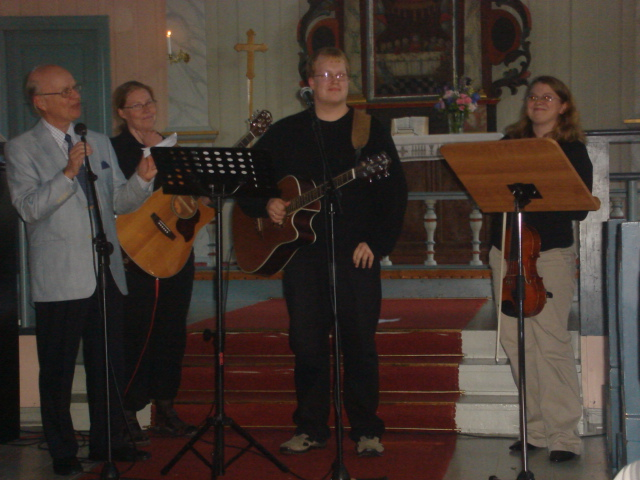

Background information
- Origin: Fyresdal Municipality, Norway
- Genres: Pop, folk, country
- Years active: 2000–2009
- Label: Spun Sugar
- Members: Øyvind Berge; Merethe Jørgensdottir Reinskås; Birgith Jørgensdottir Reinskås

Sugar Plum Fairies were a folk and pop band from Fyresdal Municipality in Vest-Telemark, Norway, formed in 2000, who released one studio album. The band plays pop music influenced by the folk music tradition of their native Telemark, using folk instruments like the Norwegian hardanger fiddle and accordion alongside guitar and piano, as well as brass instruments such as the trumpet and euphonium. The band perform songs in their native dialect.

On 2 June 2009, the band announced on their Facebook page that they were on indefinite hiatus.

== Members ==
- Øyvind Berge — vocals, guitars, bass
- Merethe Jørgensdottir Reinskås — guitars, accordion, trumpet, piano
- Birgith Jørgensdottir Reinskås — euphonium, synthesizer
- Torbjørn Strånd — drums, percussion, bass until 2005
- Tor Christian Tovslid — drums
- Gro Elisabeth Valebjørg Galambos was a part of the original line-up, but quit prior to the recording of their debut album.
- Sarah Corbisier has been a recurring member of the band's concert line-up since 2006.

== Fivrelddans ==
Sugar Plum Fairies' album, Fivrelddans (English: Butterfly Dance) was a spin-off from a concert production entitled Fivrelddans & filosofi - Haakon Lie i ord og tonar composed and performed for the Olsokdagane i Fyresdal festival in 2004. The album was co-produced by Torbjørn Kittelsen and Jørgen Eide Kittelsen in Largostudio, Rjukan, Norway in April and May 2005, and released independently through the band's own label Spun Sugar Music on 10 December 2005.

The record received several good reviews, and some airplay in Norway and abroad. The tracks "Andre Dugurdskvildi", "Fridtjof Nansen" and "Strålefall" were minor Norwegian radio hits.

The album contains music put to the poems of writer Haakon Lie, who is also from the band's hometown of Fyresdal. There were guest appearances on the album by Sarah Corbisier (viola) and Magne Berge (Hardanger fiddle). The song "Storlivisa" and the poem "Hjuringvise" featured in the original stage production, but were not recorded by the band. "Fløytarvisa hans Aslak smed" was not a part of the original stage production.

=== Track listing ===
Unless otherwise stated, all words are written by Haakon Lie with music by Øyvind Berge.

1. "Fivrelddans & filosofi" (H.Lie / M.J. Reinskås)
2. "Tid er pengar"
3. "Fyrste dugurdskvildi"
4. "Jolekveld" (H. Lie/Ø. Berge/M.J. Reinskås)
5. "Fridtjof Nansen"
6. "Andre Dugurdskvildi"
7. "Voggesong" (H. Lie/M.J. Reinskås)
8. "Sylvet"
9. "Tridje Dugurdskvildi"
10. "Fløytarvisa hans Aslak smed"
11. "Stogetaket"
12. "Einsemd"
13. "Fjorde Dugurdskvildi"
14. "Strålefall"
15. "Fivrelddans & filosofi - reprise" (H. Lie/M.J. Reinskås)

== Other appearances ==
In 2006, Paul Bernard, Norwegian rapper, hip-hop artist & producer, sampled the band's song "Jolekveld", and the resulting collaboration "Depend" was released online under the name Paul Bernard feat. Sugar Plum Fairies, as part of Bernard's album Unfinished bizniz - a collection of dreams and grey stones, with a live version included on the Paul Bernard and The Fat Fucks DVD Live at Lost Weekend. In 2007, the band appeared with Sigmund Groven and Tore Reppe as invited guests of Norsk Munnspillforum (The Norwegian Harmonica Association) at a concert in Moland kyrkje in Fyresdal. In 2008 the band was included on the October Party Records compilation album Norwegian Wood Music For China vol.5.

== Solo appearances by band members ==
Øyvind Berge contributed vocals and songwriting on the track "Ser Du Stjernene?" on Paul Bernard's album Unfinished Bizniz—a collection of dreams and grey stones, and also sang on "Fat Fucks' Theme", part of the incidental music for Paul Bernard and The Fat Fucks' DVD "Live at Lost Weekend".

In 2012 he released his debut solo album under the name "Sir Øyvind Berge & His Imaginary Orchestra", on Norwegian label Valiant Sounds.

Merethe Jørgensdottir Reinskås is a member of the Oslofjord Brass ensemble and appears on their album OfBit.

== Discography ==
- Fivrelddans - Haakon Lie i ord og tonar (Spun Sugar Records, 2005)
- "Depend" (Påls kjøkken) (Paul Bernard feat. Sugar Plum Fairies, Internet-only release, 2006)
- Norwegian Wood Music For China vol.5 (October Party Records, 2008; released exclusively in China)

== Awards ==
- The Fyresdal Municipality Culture Award (2006)
