= Bispevegen =

Road in Setesdal, Norway

Coordinates: 59°13′59″N 7°38′54″E

The Bispevegen (lit. 'Bishop's Road') is a historic road that passed between Valle in Setesdal on the western side of the mountains and Fyresdal on the eastern side. The Bispevegen is a medieval east-west track over the high plateau that priests and bishops used to get between the counties of Agder and Telemark. Every year a march called "Bispevegmarsjen" (lit. 'The Bishop's Road March') starts at Kleivgrend in Fyresdal.
