= Øvre Birtedalen =

Village in Fyresdal Municipality, Norway

- Village
- Interactive map of Øvre Birtedalen
- Coordinates: 59.05971°N 7.96531°E
- Country: Norway
- Region: Eastern Norway
- County: Telemark
- District: Vest-Telemark
- Municipality: Fyresdal Municipality
- Elevation: 633 m (2,077 ft)
- Time zone: UTC+01:00 (CET)
  - Summer (DST): UTC+02:00 (CEST)
- Post Code: 3870 Fyresdal

Øvre Birtedalen is a village in Fyresdal Municipality in Telemark county, Norway. The village is located on the shore of the lake Birtevatn, about 20 kilometres (12 mi) to the southwest of the village of Moland, the municipal centre. The area has a lot of holiday cottages.
