= Moland Church (Fyresdal) =

Church in Telemark, Norway

- Moland kyrkje
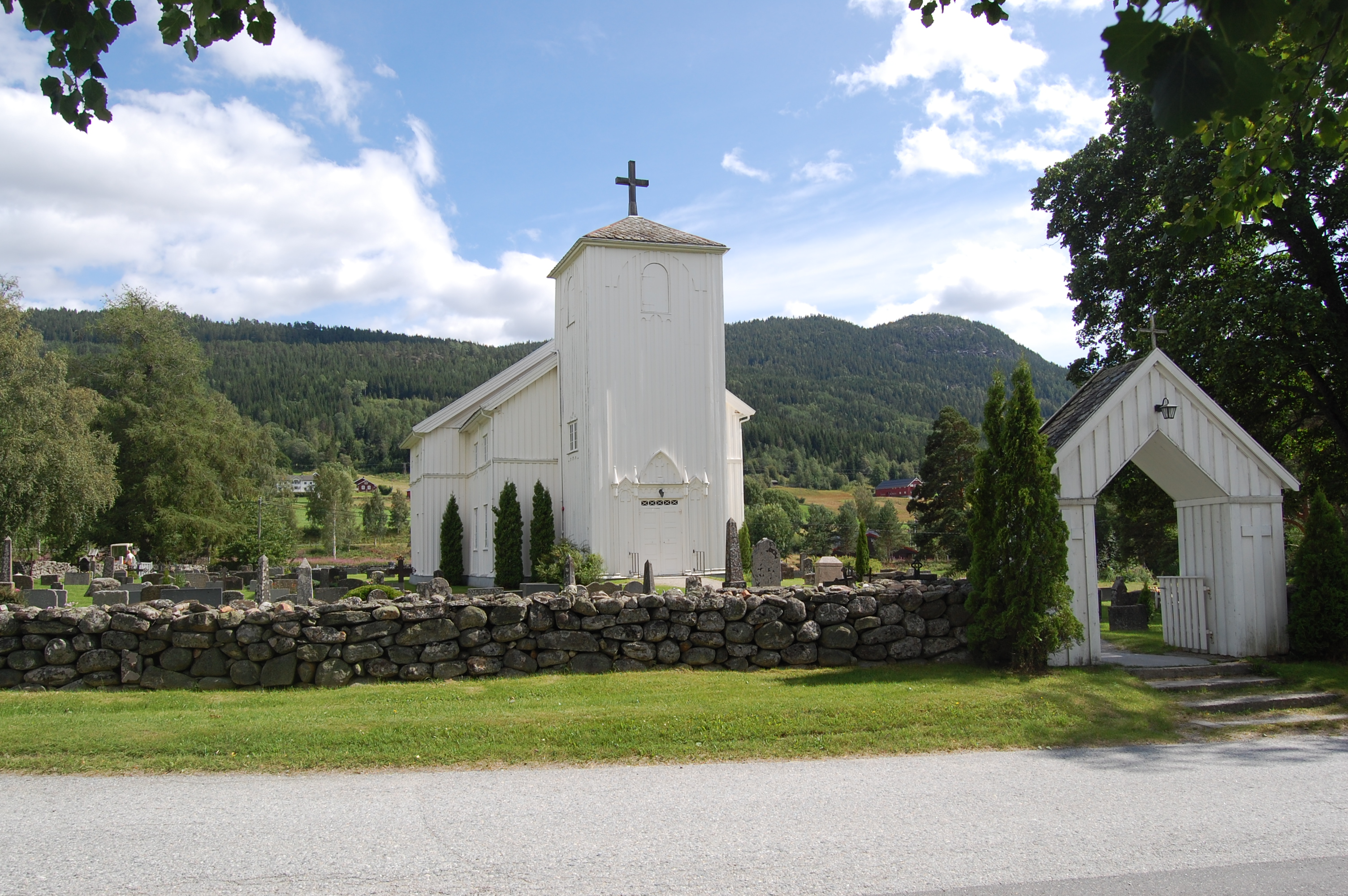
- View of the church
- Moland Church
- 59°10′55″N 8°05′12″E
- Location: Fyresdal Municipality, Telemark
- Country: Norway
- Denomination: Church of Norway
- Previous denomination: Catholic Church
- Churchmanship: Evangelical Lutheran

History
- Status: Parish church
- Founded: 13th century
- Consecrated: 2 July 1843

Architecture
- Functional status: Active
- Architectural type: Cruciform
- Completed: 1843 (183 years ago)

Specifications
- Capacity: 200
- Materials: Wood

Administration
- Diocese: Agder og Telemark bispedømme
- Deanery: Øvre Telemark prosti
- Parish: Fyresdal
- Norwegian Cultural Heritage Site
- Type: Church
- Status: Automatically protected
- ID: 84973

Moland Church (Norwegian: Moland kyrkje) is a parish church of the Church of Norway in Fyresdal Municipality in Telemark county, Norway. It is located in the village of Fyresdal. It is one of the two churches for the Fyresdal parish which is part of the Øvre Telemark prosti (deanery) in the Diocese of Agder og Telemark. The white, wooden church was built in a cruciform design in 1843 using plans drawn up by the architect Anders Thorsen Syrtveit who based the design off standard church plans made by Hans Linstow. The church seats about 200 people.

== History ==
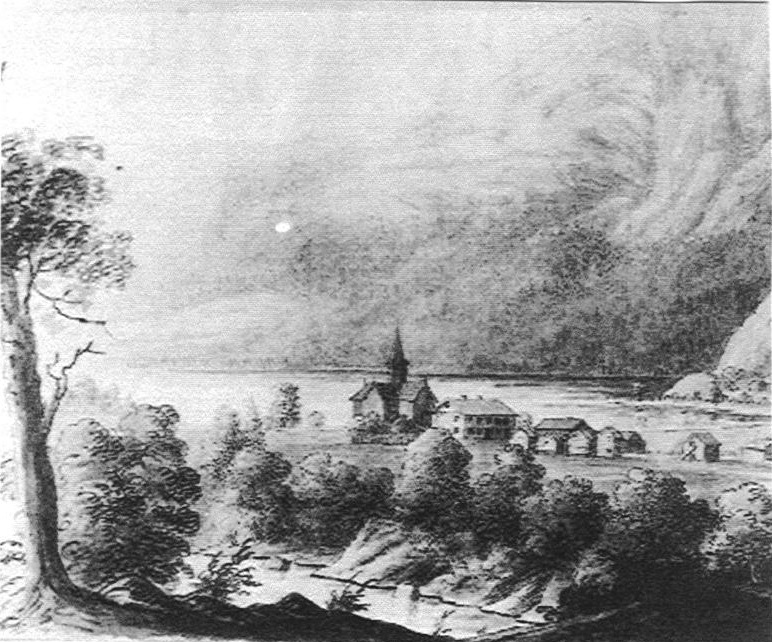
View of the church (1665-1841) and priest's farm (drawn in 1829)

The earliest existing historical records of the church date back to the year 1389, but that was not when the church was built. Legend states that the first church in Fyresdal was built during the 13th century on a site called Røykenes, about 1.9 kilometres (1.2 mi) to the west across the lake Fyresvatnet from the present location. This church was known as Vik Church and some ruins have been found on the site. The church was dedicated to Saint Lavrans.

Around the year 1342, the old church was closed and a new stave church was built across the lake at Moland next to the old rectory. In 1595, the Bishop Jens Nilssøn was visiting Fyresdal. He wrote "Moland's church, a wooden church, is right next to the vicarage." He exhorted the church to improve and maintain the church and vicarage (perhaps they were not so well cared for at that time). He wrote nothing more about the church. In 1665, the 14th-century stave church was torn down and replaced with a new church. The new building was a wooden cruciform church which was described by procurator Jonas Lund as "the most beautiful in Upper Telemark". It was decorated with oil paintings of the Oldenburg kings of Denmark-Norway from Christian I through Frederik V.

In 1814, this church served as an election church (Norwegian: valgkirke). Together with more than 300 other parish churches across Norway, it was a polling station for elections to the 1814 Norwegian Constituent Assembly which wrote the Constitution of Norway. This was Norway's first national elections. Each church parish was a constituency that elected people called "electors" who later met together in each county to elect the representatives for the assembly that was to meet at Eidsvoll Manor later that year.

In the summer of 1835, the church was damaged in a storm from the north-west, locally called "Jordalsvinden". After this, the building was considered to be too dangerous to use. The worst part of the building was the tower, which had to be demolished right away. A royal resolution of 15 March 1836 ordered that a new church should be built in Fyresdal, and that it should be built on the so-called "Landsaker" site which was thought to be a "more beautiful" location, a little north of the present site. The planning for the new church dragged on for a while and nothing came of the move. In June 1841, the 176-year-old fragile building was finally torn down. Because of great poverty in the parish during these years, it took time to raise the money for a new church, so the new building was not constructed until 1843. The new church was built based on one of Hans Linstow's standard church designs and the new building was constructed by Gunnar Tarjeisøn Klauvreid under the supervision of builder Anders Thorsen Syrtveit from Evje. Bishop Jacob von der Lippe consecrated the church on 2 July 1843. The church was renovated in 1962.

== See also ==
- List of churches in Agder og Telemark
