= Haakon Lie (forester) =

Norwegian forester and writer (1884–1970)

- Born: 29 February 1884; Fyresdal Municipality, Norway
- Died: 18 January 1970 (aged 85)
- Occupations: Forester; Writer

Haakon Lie (29 February 1884 – 18 January 1970) was a Norwegian forester, novelist, poet and children's writer.

== Personal life ==
Lie was born in Fyresdal Municipality to writer Jonas Lie (1846–1916) and Torbjørg Rinden, and married Hjørdis Dorthea Smevig Dahl in 1911.

== Forestry ==
Lie graduated from the forest school in Steinkjer Municipality in 1904, and from the Norwegian College of Agriculture in 1907. He lectured at the agricultural school in Storhove from 1910 to 1918, and at the forest school in Steinkjer from 1918 to 1923. From 1923 to 1947 he was appointed forester in southern Gudbrandsdalen. Among his works in forestry are Skogens fugler og insekter, Lærebok i Skogbotanik, Skogbrukets driftslære and Fjellskogen.

== Literary career ==
His children's books include Ekorngutten (1928), Nord i elvelandet (1933), Fuglane ved det gode berget (1959) and I villdyrskog (1961). Among his poetry collections are Ættarhaugen from 1929, Solspelet from 1931, and Fløyta og fela from 1943. Villmark og villdyr from 1949 portrays forests and animal life. He was awarded the Melsom Prize in 1950.
