= Øyane, Telemark =

Village in Fyresdal Municipality, Norway

Øyane Veum
- Village
- Interactive map of Øyane; Veum
- Coordinates: 59.28434°N 8.08966°E
- Country: Norway
- Region: Eastern Norway
- County: Telemark
- District: Vest-Telemark
- Municipality: Fyresdal Municipality
- Elevation: 325 m (1,066 ft)
- Time zone: UTC+01:00 (CET)
  - Summer (DST): UTC+02:00 (CEST)
- Post Code: 3870 Fyresdal

Øyane or Veum is a village in Fyresdal Municipality in Telemark county, Norway. The village is located about 10 kilometres (6.2 mi) north of the village of Moland, the municipal centre. Veum Church is located in the village. The village is located along Norwegian County Road 355.
