= Fyresdal Municipality =

Municipality in Telemark, Norway

Fyresdal Municipality Fyresdal kommune
- Municipality
- Moland herred (historic name)
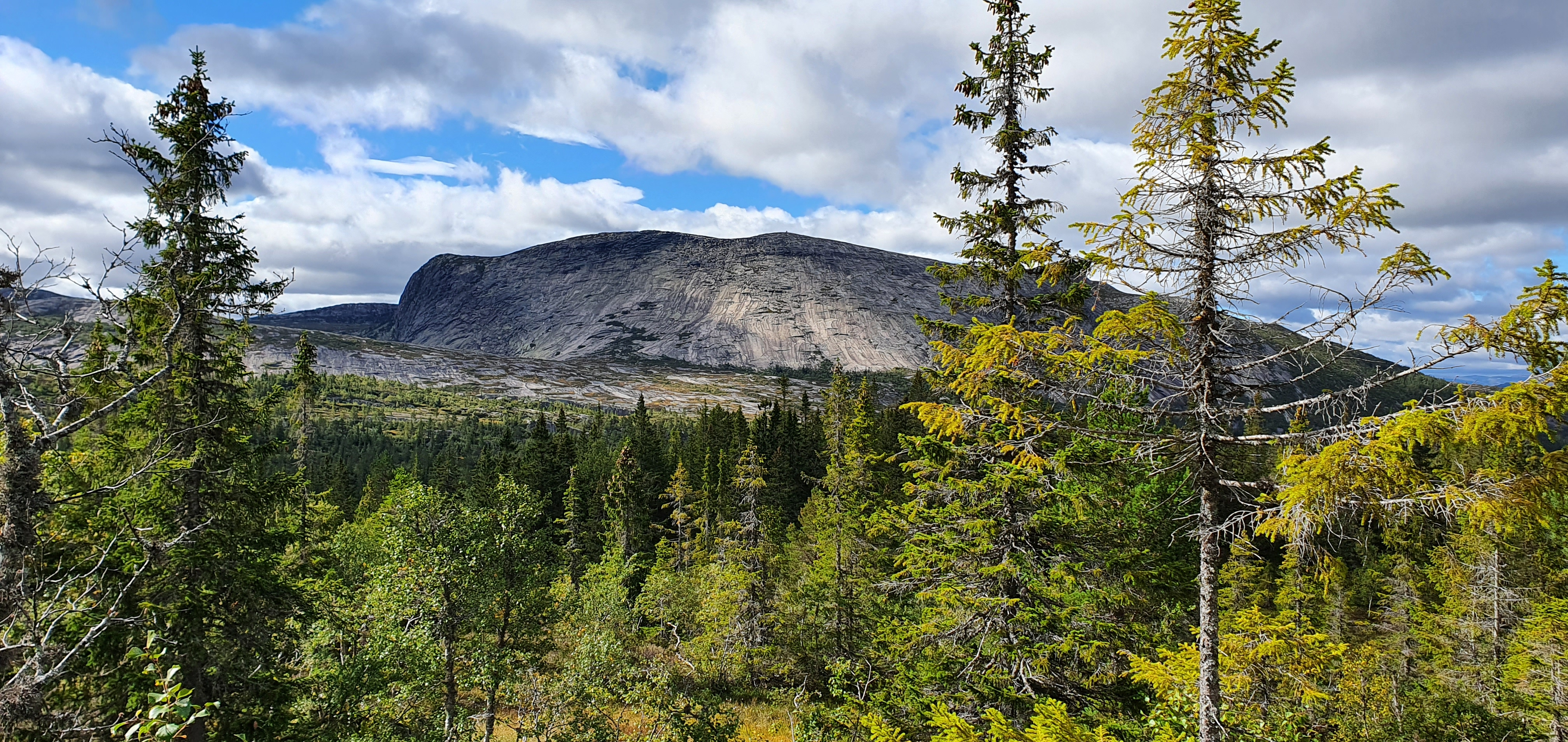
- View of the mountain Roan

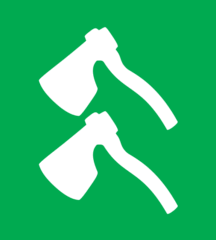
- Flag Coat of arms

- Telemark within Norway

- Fyresdal within Telemark
- Coordinates: 59°9′57″N 8°1′11″E
- Country: Norway
- County: Telemark
- District: Vest-Telemark
- Established: 1 Jan 1838
  - Created as: Formannskapsdistrikt
- Administrative centre: Moland

Government
  - Mayor (2011): Erik Skjervagen (Ap)

Area
  - Total: 1,280.02 km^{2} (494.22 sq mi)
  - Land: 1,106.74 km^{2} (427.31 sq mi)
  - Water: 173.28 km^{2} (66.90 sq mi) 13.5%
  - Rank: #78 in Norway
- Highest elevation: 1,283.7 m (4,212 ft)

Population (2026)
  - Total: 1,274
  - Rank: #316 in Norway
  - Density: 1.2/km^{2} (3.1/sq mi)
  - Change (10 years): ▼ −3.7%
- Demonym: Fyresdøl

Official language
  - Norwegian form: Nynorsk
- Time zone: UTC+01:00 (CET)
  - Summer (DST): UTC+02:00 (CEST)
- ISO 3166 code: NO-4032
- Website: Official website

Fyresdal (Norwegian pronunciation: [²fyːrəsdɑːl]; locally [¹førsdaːl]) is a municipality in Telemark county, Norway. It is located in the traditional district of Vest-Telemark. The administrative centre of the municipality is the village of Moland. Other villages in Fyresdal include Kilegrend, Øvre Birtedalen, and Øyane.

The 1,280.02-square-kilometre (494.22 sq mi) municipality is the 78th largest by area out of the 357 municipalities in Norway. Fyresdal Municipality is the 316th most populous municipality in Norway with a population of 1,274. The municipality's population density is 1.2 inhabitants per square kilometre (3.1/sq mi) and its population has decreased by 3.7% over the previous 10-year period.

== General information ==
=== Administrative history ===
The formannskapsdistrikt law of 1837 created a system of local government in Norway by establishing each Church of Norway prestegjeld as a civil municipality. On 1 January 1838, Moland prestegjeld was established as Moland Municipality. In 1879, the name of the municipality was changed to Fyresdal Municipality. The borders of the municipality have not changed since that time (which is pretty rare among municipalities in Norway).

In 2020, there were many municipal and county mergers across Norway due to the work of the Solberg cabinet. Historically, this municipality was part of Telemark county. On 1 January 2020, the municipality became a part of the newly-formed Vestfold og Telemark county (after Telemark and Vestfold counties were merged). The merger was shortlived, and on 1 January 2024, the merger was undone and this municipality became part of Telemark county once again.

=== Name ===
The municipality (originally the parish) was first named after the old Moland farm (Old Norse: Mólanda) since the first Moland Church was built there. The first element is mór which means "moorland" or "heath". The last element is land which means "land" or "district".

On 28 June 1879, a royal resolution changed the name of the municipality to Fyresdal. This name (Old Norse: Fyrisdalr) was chosen since it is the name of the valley in which the municipality is located. The first element of this name is the genitive case of the name of the local lake Fyresvatnet (Old Norse: Fyrir). The name of the lake is derived from the word fura which means "pine tree". The last element of the name is dalr which means "valley" or "dale".

=== Coat of arms ===
The coat of arms was granted on 24 April 1992. The official blazon is "Vert two bendwise axes argent in pale" (Norwegian: På grøn grunn to skråstilte sølv øksar). This means the arms have a green field (background) and the charge is a broadaxe. The broadaxes have a tincture of argent which means it is colored white most of the time, but if it is made out of metal, then silver is used. The green color in the field and the broadaxe were chosen to symbolize the importance of forestry in the municipality. The arms were the result of a local competition, which resulted in 42 different proposals being submitted. The winning design for the arms was submitted by Halvor Holtskog Jr. The municipal flag has the same design as the coat of arms.

=== Churches ===
The Church of Norway has one parish (sokn) within Fyresdal Municipality. It is part of the Øvre Telemark prosti (deanery) in the Diocese of Agder og Telemark.

Churches in Fyresdal Municipality
Parish (sokn)	Church name	Location of the church	Year built
Fyresdal	Moland Church	Moland	1843
Fyresdal	Veum Church	Øyane	1863

== History ==
Fyresdal is known for its many findings from the Viking Age, its mighty Viking graves, heaps of slag, and the former Heggland pilgrim church that once stood proudly north of the village centre. People traveled to this church from all over Norway and even from Europe. It was said that the stream running behind the church had healing powers.

A few miles south of the site where the Heggland Pilgrim Church (Norwegian: Heggland Kyrkje), once stood at Molandsmoen, a stone with Runic inscriptions can be found. This is a reminder from the Viking Age when horse battles were held there. Originally, one believes, there were four of them. Klokkarhamaren is a little mountain on a peninsula in the municipal centre, and it is the location of a cave called Munkhola. It is believed that a certain number of monks in medieval times resided, held masses, and sought refuge here.

== Government ==
Fyresdal Municipality is responsible for primary education (through 10th grade), outpatient health services, senior citizen services, welfare and other social services, zoning, economic development, and municipal roads and utilities. The municipality is governed by a municipal council of directly elected representatives. The mayor is indirectly elected by a vote of the municipal council. The municipality is under the jurisdiction of the Øvre Telemark District Court and the Agder Court of Appeal.

=== Municipal council ===
The municipal council (Kommunestyre) of Fyresdal Municipality is made up of 17 representatives that are elected to four-year terms. The tables below show the current and historical composition of the council by political party.

Fyresdal kommunestyre 2023–2027
Party name (in Nynorsk)	Number of representatives
Labour Party (Arbeidarpartiet)	9
Centre Party (Senterpartiet)	8
Total number of members:	17

Fyresdal kommunestyre 2019–2023
Party name (in Nynorsk)	Number of representatives
Labour Party (Arbeidarpartiet)	9
Conservative Party (Høgre)	2
Centre Party (Senterpartiet)	6
Total number of members:	17

Fyresdal kommunestyre 2015–2019
Party name (in Nynorsk)	Number of representatives
Labour Party (Arbeidarpartiet)	10
Centre Party (Senterpartiet)	7
Total number of members:	17

Fyresdal kommunestyre 2011–2015
Party name (in Nynorsk)	Number of representatives
Labour Party (Arbeidarpartiet)	7
Centre Party (Senterpartiet)	3
Local list (Bygdelista)	3
Total number of members:	13

Fyresdal kommunestyre 2007–2011
Party name (in Nynorsk)	Number of representatives
Labour Party (Arbeidarpartiet)	6
Centre Party (Senterpartiet)	8
Local list (Bygdelista)	7
Total number of members:	21

Fyresdal kommunestyre 2003–2007
Party name (in Nynorsk)	Number of representatives
Labour Party (Arbeidarpartiet)	7
Centre Party (Senterpartiet)	5
Local list (Bygdelista)	9
Total number of members:	21

Fyresdal kommunestyre 1999–2003
Party name (in Nynorsk)	Number of representatives
Labour Party (Arbeidarpartiet)	9
Centre Party (Senterpartiet)	5
Local list (Bygdelista)	7
Total number of members:	21

Fyresdal kommunestyre 1995–1999
Party name (in Nynorsk)	Number of representatives
Labour Party (Arbeidarpartiet)	12
Centre Party (Senterpartiet)	8
Socialist Left Party (Sosialistisk Venstreparti)	1
Total number of members:	21

Fyresdal kommunestyre 1991–1995
Party name (in Nynorsk)	Number of representatives
Labour Party (Arbeidarpartiet)	9
Conservative Party (Høgre)	2
Centre Party (Senterpartiet)	5
Socialist Left Party (Sosialistisk Venstreparti)	3
Joint list of the Liberal Party (Venstre) and Christian Democratic Party (Kristelig Folkeparti)	2
Total number of members:	21

Fyresdal kommunestyre 1987–1991
Party name (in Nynorsk)	Number of representatives
Labour Party (Arbeidarpartiet)	14
Conservative Party (Høgre)	2
Christian Democratic Party (Kristeleg Folkeparti)	1
Centre Party (Senterpartiet)	3
Liberal Party (Venstre)	1
Total number of members:	21

Fyresdal kommunestyre 1983–1987
Party name (in Nynorsk)	Number of representatives
Labour Party (Arbeidarpartiet)	13
Liberal Party (Venstre)	1
Joint list of the Conservative Party (Høgre), Christian Democratic Party (Kristeleg Folkeparti), and Centre Party (Senterpartiet)	7
Total number of members:	21

Fyresdal kommunestyre 1979–1983
Party name (in Nynorsk)	Number of representatives
Labour Party (Arbeidarpartiet)	13
Christian Democratic Party (Kristeleg Folkeparti)	2
Liberal Party (Venstre)	1
Joint list of the Conservative Party (Høgre) and the Centre Party (Senterpartiet)	5
Total number of members:	21

Fyresdal kommunestyre 1975–1979
Party name (in Nynorsk)	Number of representatives
Labour Party (Arbeidarpartiet)	12
Christian Democratic Party (Kristeleg Folkeparti)	2
Joint list of the Conservative Party (Høgre), Centre Party (Senterpartiet), and Liberal Party (Venstre)	7
Total number of members:	21

Fyresdal kommunestyre 1971–1975
Party name (in Nynorsk)	Number of representatives
Labour Party (Arbeidarpartiet)	14
Christian Democratic Party (Kristeleg Folkeparti)	1
Centre Party (Senterpartiet)	4
Liberal Party (Venstre)	2
Total number of members:	21

Fyresdal kommunestyre 1967–1971
Party name (in Nynorsk)	Number of representatives
Labour Party (Arbeidarpartiet)	14
Christian Democratic Party (Kristeleg Folkeparti)	2
Centre Party (Senterpartiet)	3
Liberal Party (Venstre)	2
Total number of members:	21

Fyresdal kommunestyre 1963–1967
Party name (in Nynorsk)	Number of representatives
Labour Party (Arbeidarpartiet)	14
Christian Democratic Party (Kristeleg Folkeparti)	1
Joint List(s) of Non-Socialist Parties (Borgarlege Felleslister)	6
Total number of members:	21

Fyresdal heradsstyre 1959–1963
Party name (in Nynorsk)	Number of representatives
Labour Party (Arbeidarpartiet)	14
Christian Democratic Party (Kristeleg Folkeparti)	2
Centre Party (Senterpartiet)	3
Liberal Party (Venstre)	2
Total number of members:	21

Fyresdal heradsstyre 1955–1959
Party name (in Nynorsk)	Number of representatives
Labour Party (Arbeidarpartiet)	14
Joint List(s) of Non-Socialist Parties (Borgarlege Felleslister)	7
Total number of members:	21

Fyresdal heradsstyre 1951–1955
Party name (in Nynorsk)	Number of representatives
Labour Party (Arbeidarpartiet)	16
Farmers' Party (Bondepartiet)	3
Liberal Party (Venstre)	5
Total number of members:	24

Fyresdal heradsstyre 1947–1951
Party name (in Nynorsk)	Number of representatives
Labour Party (Arbeidarpartiet)	16
Joint List(s) of Non-Socialist Parties (Borgarlege Felleslister)	8
Total number of members:	24

Fyresdal heradsstyre 1945–1947
Party name (in Nynorsk)	Number of representatives
Labour Party (Arbeidarpartiet)	17
Joint list of the Liberal Party (Venstre) and the Radical People's Party (Radikale Folkepartiet)	7
Total number of members:	24

Fyresdal heradsstyre 1937–1941*
Party name (in Nynorsk)	Number of representatives
Labour Party (Arbeidarpartiet)	15
Farmers' Party (Bondepartiet)	3
Liberal Party (Venstre)	4
Local List(s) (Lokale lister)	2
Total number of members:	24
Note: Due to the German occupation of Norway during World War II, no elections were held for new municipal councils until after the war ended in 1945.

=== Mayors ===
The mayor (Nynorsk: ordførar) of Fyresdal Municipality is the political leader of the municipality and the chairperson of the municipal council. The following people have held this position:

- 1838–1839: Rev. Christian Høy
- 1840–1840: Aani T. Folsæ
- 1841–1848: Rev. Fredrik Karl Mülertz
- 1849–1849: Knut O. Brokke
- 1850–1865: Rev. Iver Andreas Teisner
- 1866–1881: Halvor Paulsen Sitje
- 1882–1887: Halvor Johnsen Husstøyl
- 1888–1893: Halvor Paulsen Sitje
- 1894–1901: Gj. Veum
- 1902–1904: J.K. Kiland
- 1905–1907: Olav Rui
- 1908–1922: Andreas Berge
- 1923–1928: Andreas Hauge
- 1929–1931: Torstein Bringa
- 1932–1937: Gunnar T. Skræi
- 1938–1940: Tarjei K. Haasum (Ap)
- 1941–1945: Eivind Spokkeli (NS)
- 1945–1946: Torgeir T. Tveit (Ap)
- 1946–1946: Knut O. Skrede (Ap)
- 1946–1947: Aslak Brattland (Ap)
- 1948–1963: Hans J. Sølyst (Ap)
- 1964–1967: Johan Lauvdal (Ap)
- 1968–1981: Sverre Berge (Ap)
- 1981–1991: Halvor Lauvrak (Ap)
- 1991–1999: Kari E. Kile (Ap)
- 1999–2007: Saamund Gjersund (LL)
- 2007–2011: Bjørn Fredrik Nome (Sp)
- 2011–present: Erik Skjervagen (Ap)

== Economy ==
Most people in the municipality work in the fields of agriculture, forestry, trade, industry, and tourism. There are not many full-time farmers left in Fyresdal, but many people derive a secondary income from agriculture and forestry.

The largest employer in the municipality is Telemark Kildevann which makes bottled water and soft drinks for the national and Swedish markets. There are also a few small high-competence mechanical factories which produce parts for the offshore industry.

Data centers are being constructed until 2029. The cost has been set at Norwegian kroner 36 billion

== Transportation ==
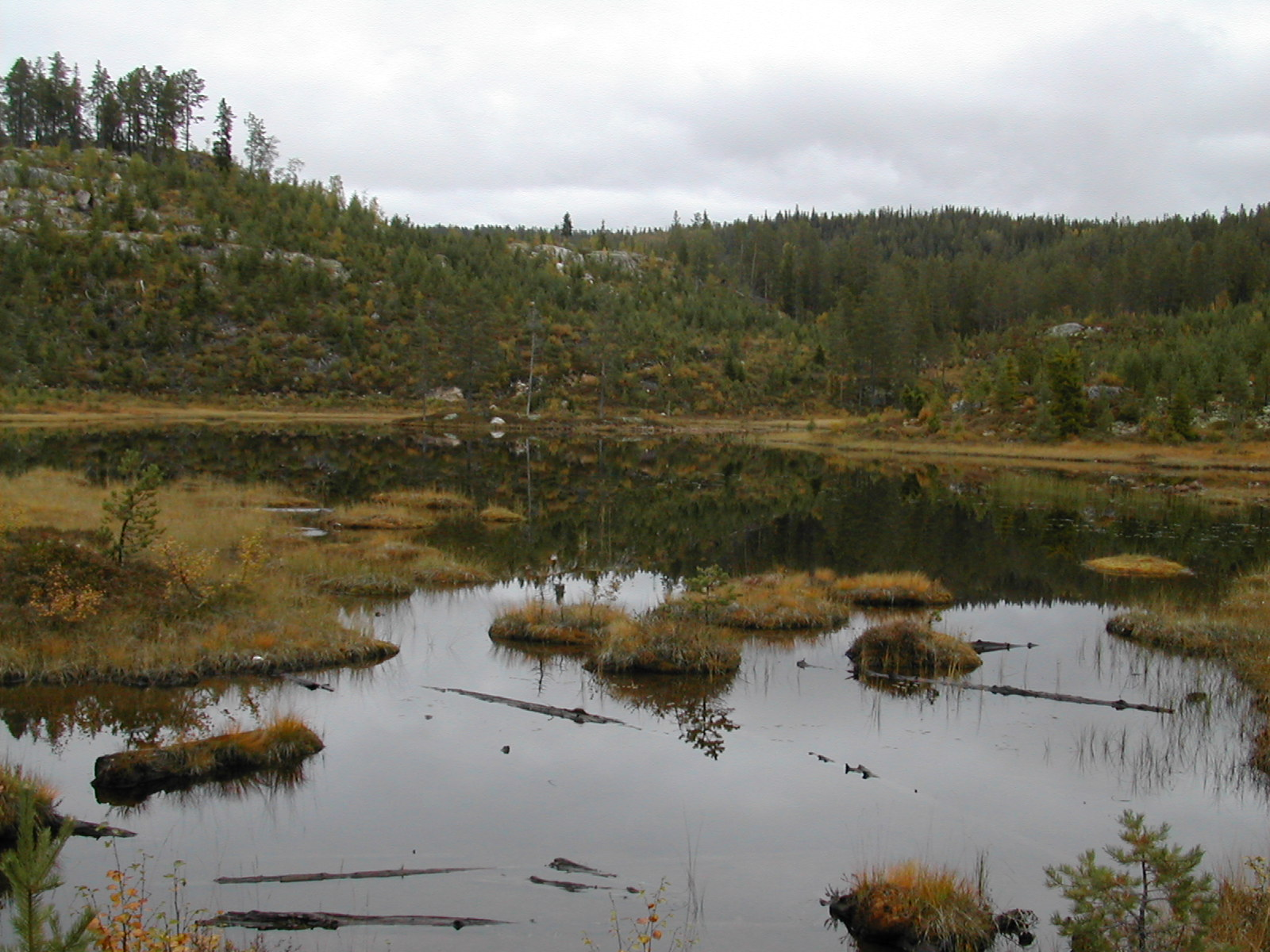
Small lake in Fyresdal

The Vest-Telemark airport, Fyresdal is located in the village of Fyresdal, with a nearby hotel. This is a joint operation under the name Airparc Fyresdal. Fyresdal has bus connections with the town centres of Skien and Porsgrunn in Telemark county; Arendal in Agder county; Bergen in Vestland county; Haugesund in Rogaland county; and to the capital, Oslo. A bus also travels every school day of the year between Fyresdal and Dalen, the municipal centre of the neighboring Tokke Municipality.

== Geography ==
Fyresdal Municipality consists of several little villages north of Moland, in the main valley of Fyresdalen, and on the western and southeastern shores of Fyresvatnet, one of Norway's deepest lakes. The highest point in the municipality is the 1,283.7-metre (4,212 ft) tall mountain Napuren, a tri-point on the border of Tokke Municipality, Valle Municipality, and Fyresdal Municipality.

The village of Moland (also called Fyresdal) is the location of the municipal council, the school, the community house, kindergartens, the home for the elderly, and most of the commercial enterprises in the municipality. Moland is the most heavily populated area of Fyresdal.

Fyresdal is among the westernmost municipalities in Telemark. Tokke Municipality lies to the north, Kviteseid Municipality lies to the northeast, Nissedal Municipality lies to the east, Åmli Municipality (in Agder county) lies to the south, Bygland Municipality (in Agder county) lies to the southwest, and Valle Municipality (in Agder county) lies to the west.

=== Settlements ===
Village areas in Fyresdal Municipality:

- Fyresdal
- Geitstadgrend
- Spockeligrend
- Momrak
- Sitje
- Tøddebakkane
- Folkestadbyen
- Øvre Birtedalen
- Nedre Birtedalen
- Fardal
- Breivik
- Hegglandsgrend
- Grunnvik
- Moland
- Veum
- Hauggrend
- Liegrend
- Fjellgardane
- Kilegrend

== Attractions ==
- One of Fyresdal's two churches (Moland Church) and the vicarage (Fyresdal Prestegard) are located in Moland. According to Telemark folklore, the Troll of Røykjenes moved across the lake because the bells of the Moland Church were disturbing its nap. The vicarage is where Vidkun Quisling was born.
- Within the administrative center of Moland, one also finds the old village centre, Folkestadbyen. Folkestadbyen is the location of the Fyresdal Vertshus, a Swiss-styled dwelling built in 1890. It has housed and served both food and drinks to locals and travellers for over 100 years. Øyskogen park, which contains Viking graves and a lot of traditional Telemark houses (e.g. lofts and stabburs) is also part of the old village. The Fyresdal Bygdemuseum, the village museum, is also located in Øyskogen.
- Fv 355 runs straight through the municipality from north to south. Hegglandsgrend, Veum, and Hauggrend are villages along Fv 355 located north of Moland. Hegglandsgrend is the home of Heggland Gamle Kyrkjegard; Veum is the home of Veum Church. A Rudolf Steiner School (an upper secondary level school) was located at Foldsæ in Hauggrend. This so-called friskole ("Free school") based on the thoughts and ideas of Rudolf Steiner was however closed down after few years. In Hauggrend, one also finds the most distinct mountain in Fyresdal, Roan. This peak is 1,192 metres (3,911 ft) above sea level, but not the highest point in the municipality, since the border to Valle Municipality passes near the peak of Napuren, at a height of 1,284 metres (4,213 ft) above sea level, some 300 feet higher.
- North of Moland, to the west from the main valley we find the little settlements of Kleivgrend, Åslandsgrend. Turning left of the Fv 355 in Hegglandsgrend, one comes to Kleivgrend and Åslandsgrend. Between Kleivgrend and the neighbouring Valle Municipality on the western side of the mountains, one finds an old track that priests and bishops used to get between the counties of Agder and Telemark. This track is named Bispevegen ("Bishop's Road") and every year a march called Bispevegmarsjen ("The Bishop's Road March") starts in Kleivgrend. In Fjellgardane, Germans ran mines in the 16th century at Moisesberg.
- On the western shores of the lake Fyresvatnet, to the southwest of Moland, one finds the villages of Fardal, Breivik. Here one finds an old and interesting stone called Røykjenessteinen. In 2005, one also found some arrowheads in this area that are believed to be 4000–4500 years old. Farther along the country road we find Øvre Birtedalen, a popular place for people to have mountain cabins.
- South of Moland, at the southern end of Fv 355 across the scenic and mighty mountain of Våmur where one can see the lake from up above, one comes to the little village of Kilegrend. In the old days, there was no road connecting Kilegrend with the municipal centre. Thus one had to travel by boat. For years the steamboats called Teisner and Fyresdølen travelled between Moland and Kilegrend. The latter eventually capsized and sank. The wreck is still visible in Kilegrend.
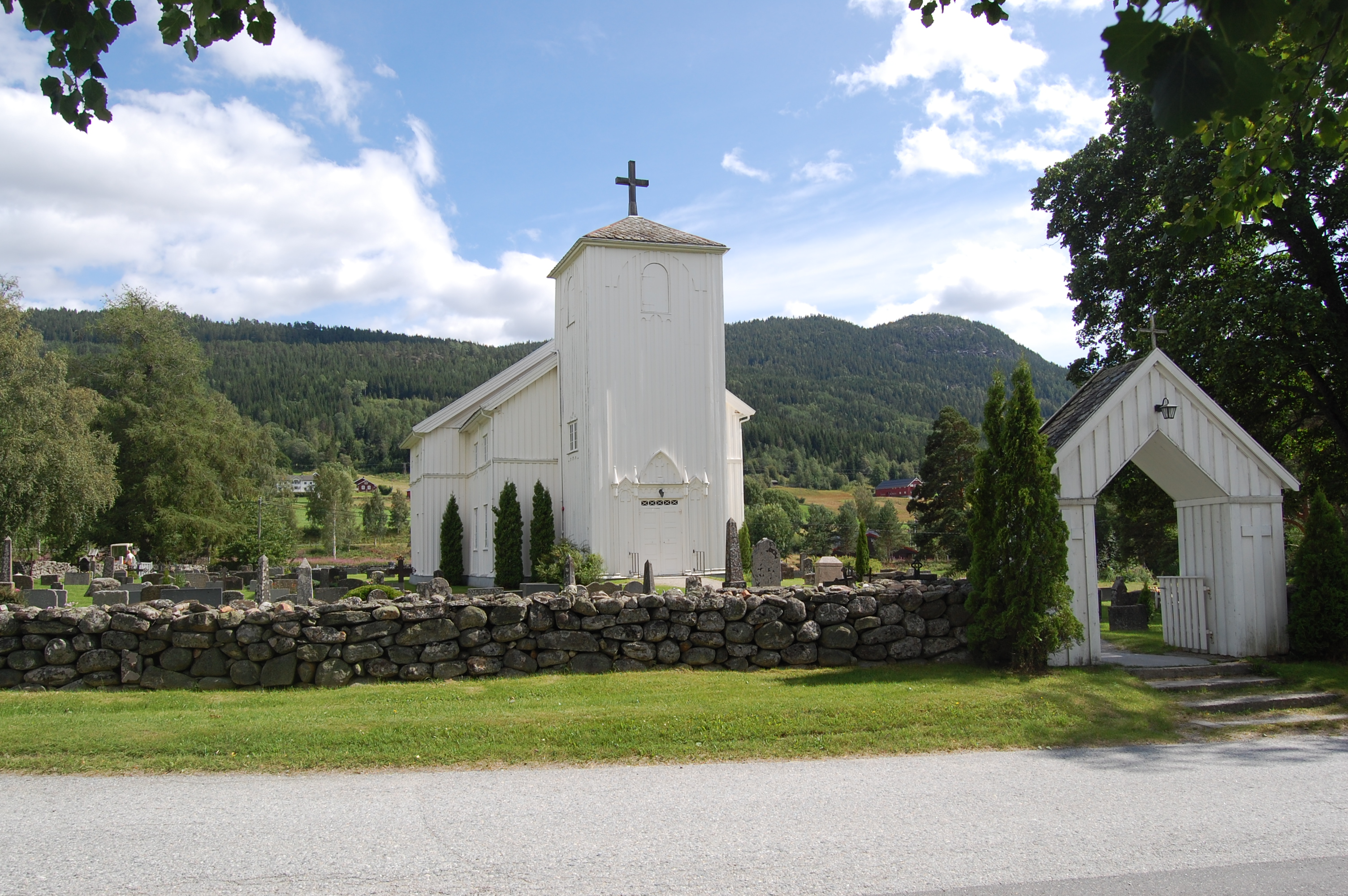
Moland Church

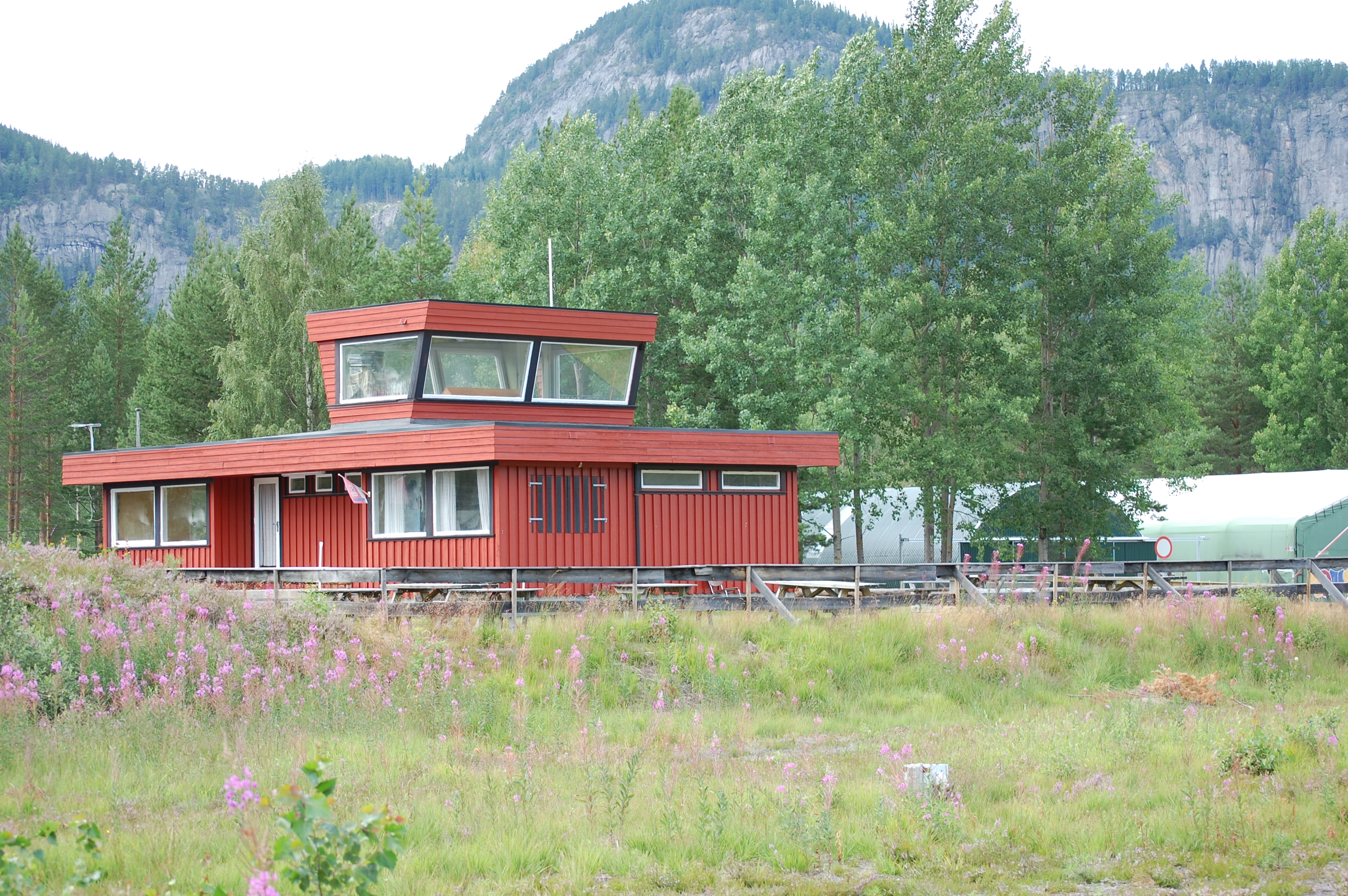
Fyresdal Airport

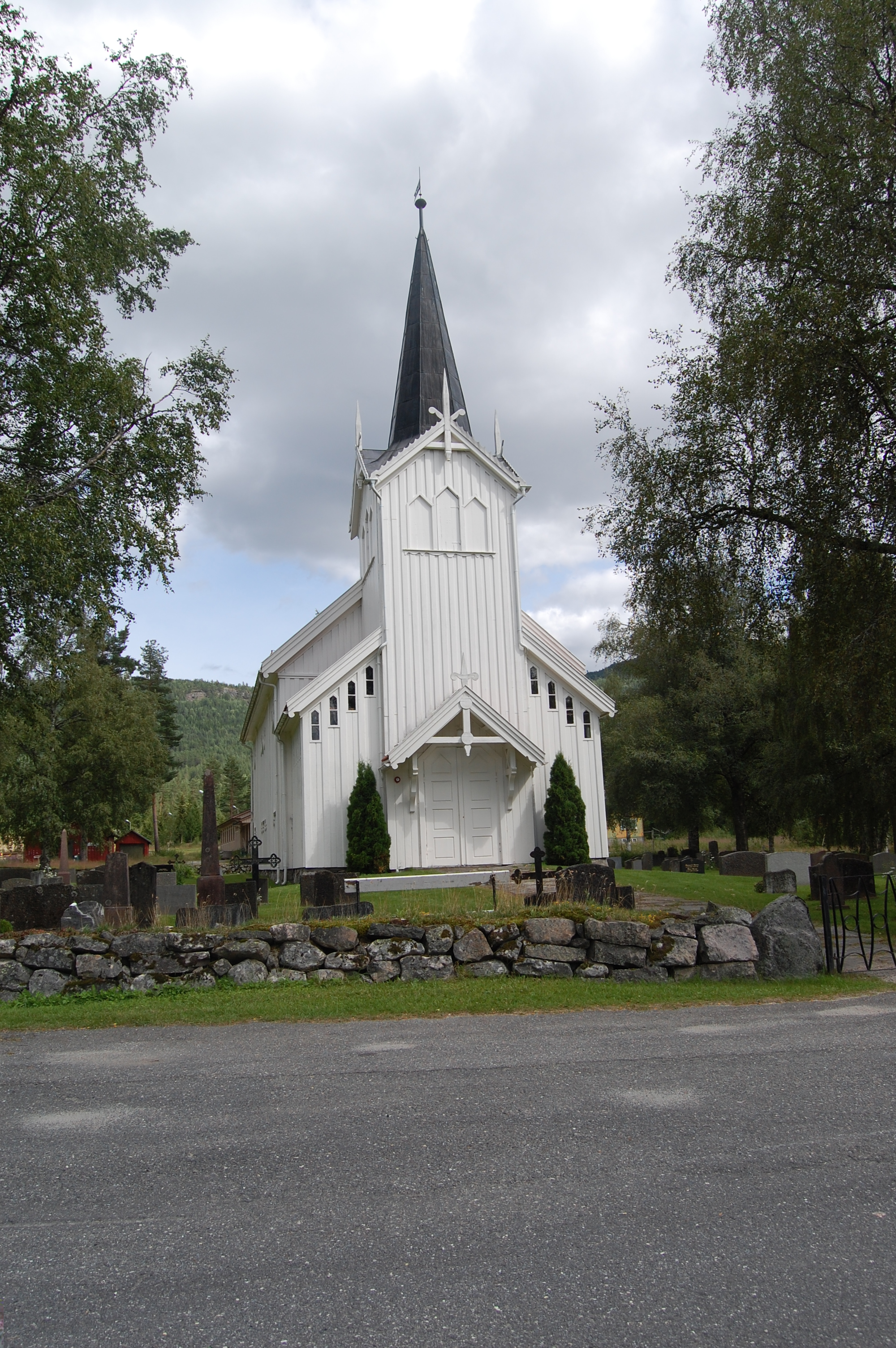
Veum Church

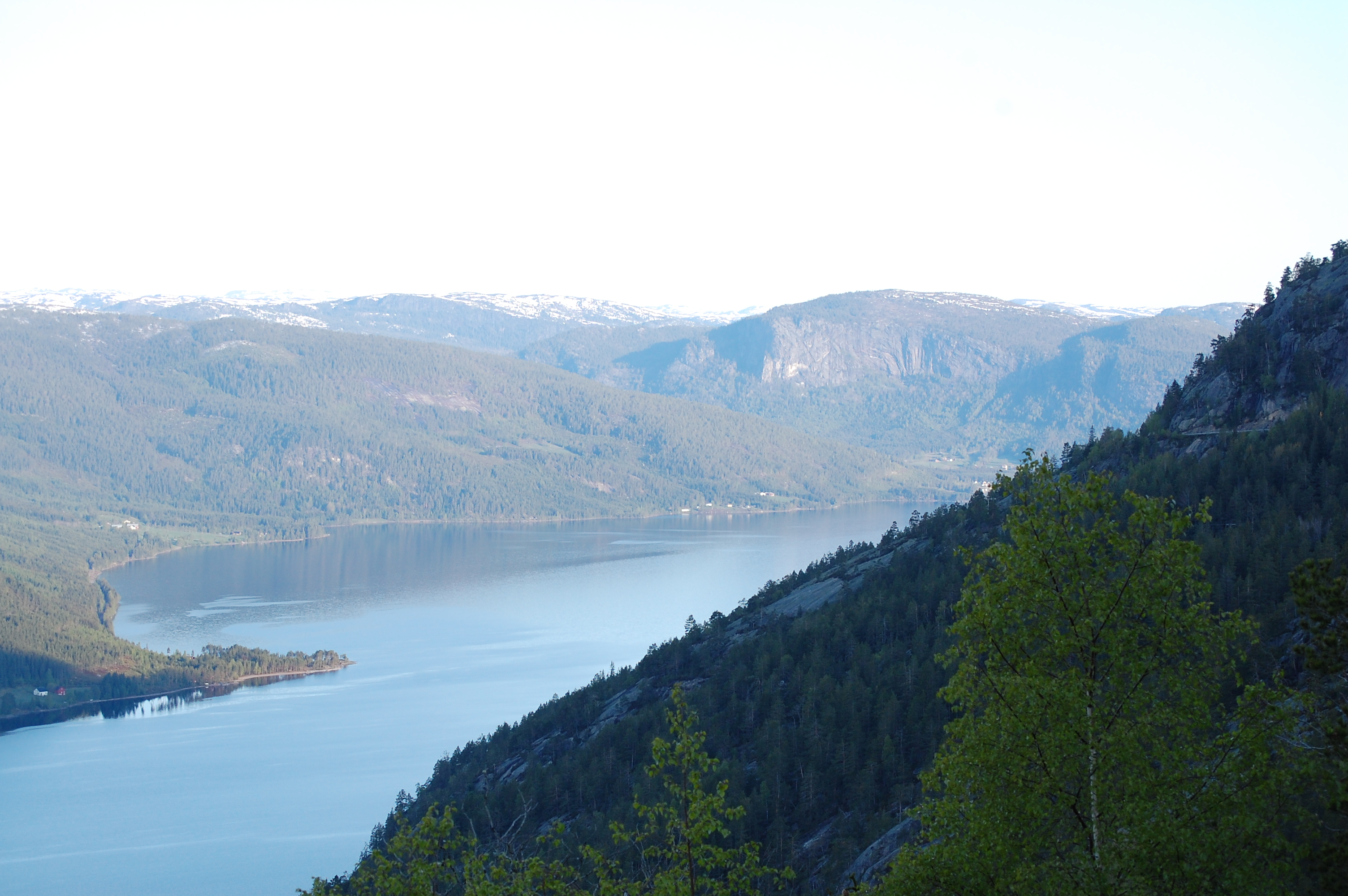
Fyresvatnet (Lake Fyresdal)

== Notable people ==
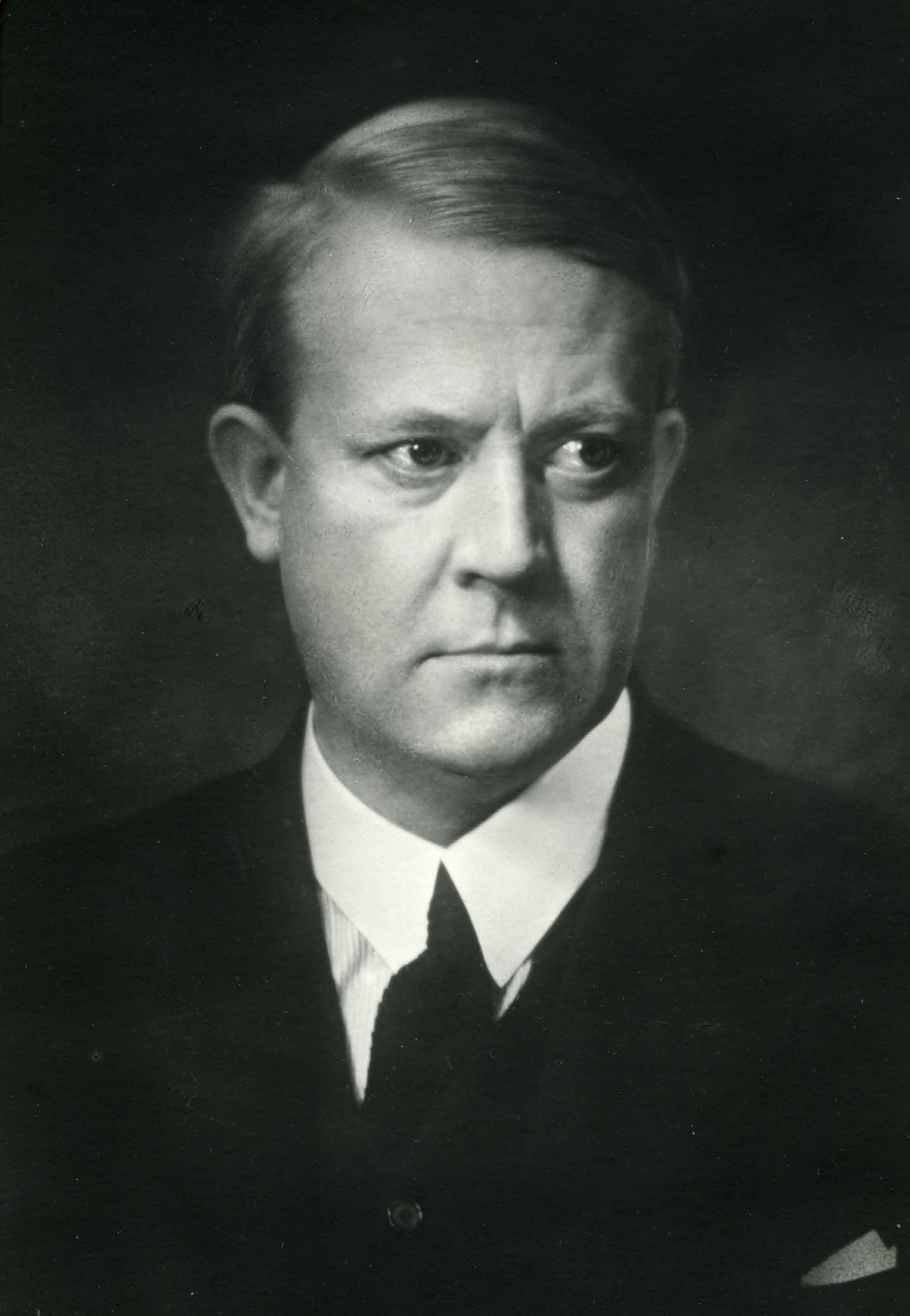
Vidkun Quisling

- Petter Veum, (Norwegian Wiki) (1811 in Fyresdal - 1889), a fiddler
- Jon Lauritz Qvisling, (Norwegian Wiki) (1844 in Fyresdal - 1930), a clergyman, author, and genealogist
- John Lie, (Norwegian Wiki) (1846 in Fyresdal - 1916), an author
- Ivar Peterson Tveiten (1850 in Fyresdal – 1934), a teacher and politician
- Torgeir Vraa (1868 in Fyresdal – 1934), an educator, newspaper editor, and politician
- Haakon Lie (1884 in Fyresdal – 1970), a forester, novelist, poet, and children's writer
- Vidkun Quisling (1887 in Fyresdal – 1945), a military officer, politician, Nazi collaborator, & traitor
- Frode Rui, (Norwegian Wiki) (born 1969 im Fyresdal), a weightlifter
- Sugar Plum Fairies (formed 2000 in Fyresdal – 2009), a folk and pop band
