= Moland, Telemark =

Village in Fyresdal Municipality, Norway

Moland Fyresdal Kyrkjebygdi
- Village
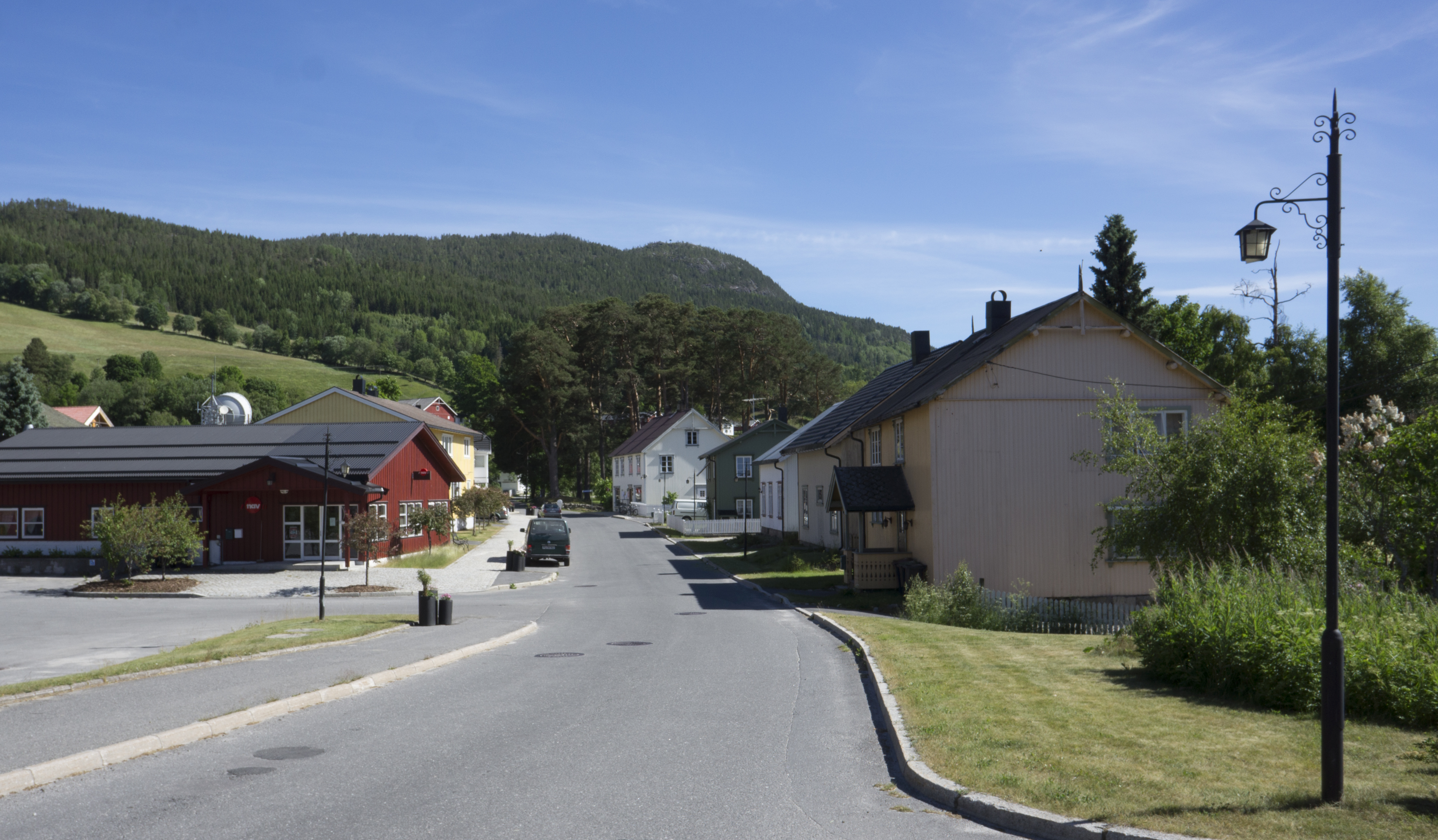
- View of the village
- Interactive map of Moland; Fyresdal
- Coordinates: 59.18343°N 8.0921°E
- Country: Norway
- Region: Eastern Norway
- County: Telemark
- District: Vest-Telemark
- Municipality: Fyresdal Municipality

Area
  - Total: 0.67 km^{2} (0.26 sq mi)
- Elevation: 288 m (945 ft)

Population (2025)
  - Total: 366
  - Density: 546/km^{2} (1,410/sq mi)
- Time zone: UTC+01:00 (CET)
  - Summer (DST): UTC+02:00 (CEST)
- Post Code: 3870 Fyresdal

Moland or Fyresdal is the administrative centre of Fyresdal Municipality in Telemark county, Norway. The village is located at the north end of the lake Fyresvatnet. The Moland Church is located in the village (which is why it's sometimes called Kyrkjebygdi which means "the church village").

The 0.67-square-kilometre (170-acre) village has a population (2025) of 366 and a population density of 546 inhabitants per square kilometre (1,410/sq mi).

The village has a primary school, kindergarten, medical centre, retirement home, bank, shops, museum, hotel, airport, petrol stations, and community centre. At the northern end of the village center you will find the Molandsmoen industrial area which is where several companies are located including Telemark Lys and the spring water producer Telemark Kildevann, which produces water from Fyresdal under the brand name Bonaqua Silver. The oldest part of the village dates back to the 1870s, when the village was known as Folkestadbyen. Today, those old buildings are preserved as part of the Vest-Telemark Museum.
