= Gautefall =

Village in Drangedal Municipality, Norway

Gautefall Gautefallheia
- Village
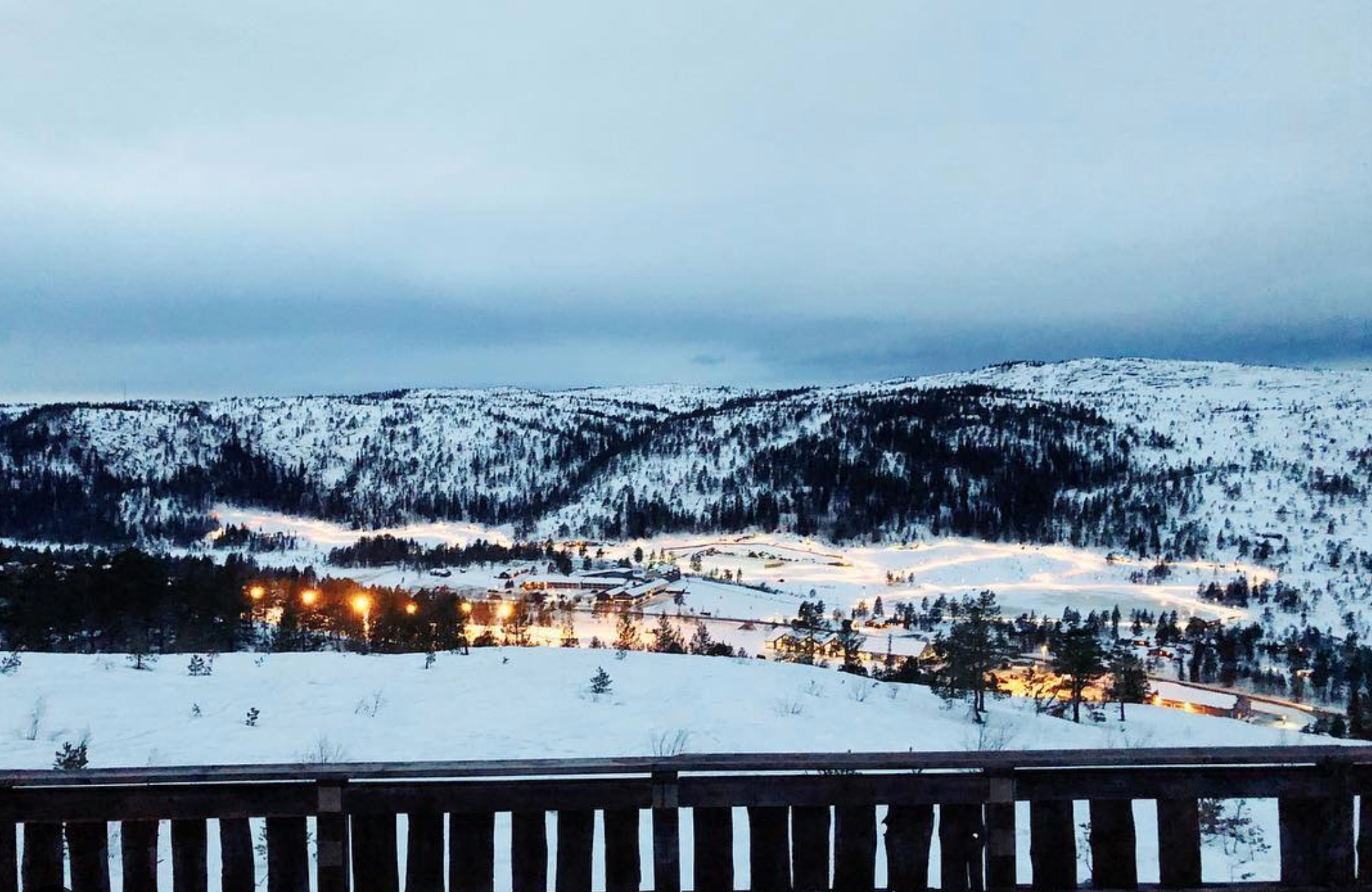
- View of Gautefall as seen from Rytterspranget
- Interactive map of the village
- Coordinates: 59.07285°N 8.74883°E
- Country: Norway
- Region: Eastern Norway
- County: Telemark
- District: Grenland
- Municipality: Drangedal Municipality
- Elevation: 370 m (1,210 ft)
- Time zone: UTC+01:00 (CET)
  - Summer (DST): UTC+02:00 (CEST)
- Post Code: 3750 Drangedal

Gautefall (also known as Gautefallheia) is a mountain village in Drangedal Municipality in Telemark county, Norway. The village is located in the mountains about 12 kilometres (7.5 mi) southwest of the village of Bustrak (in Drangedal Municipality) and about 15 kilometres (9.3 mi) northeast of the village of Treungen (in Nissedal Municipality). Gautefall is home to a ski center and tourist resort. The village area consists mostly of vacation homes and cabins. It is located in a mountainous area and is a major winter sports destination. It is a popular destination for skiing, hiking, fishing, hunting, swimming, and other recreational activities.

Gautefall Ski Resort is one of the largest alpine centers in Telemark county. It is home to 15 slopes, 1 chairlift, 5 surface lifts, and a roll band. It has a total capacity of 7000 people per hour. The terrain park also offers small jumps, big jumps, and various rails. The children park has conveyor belts and a ski school. The ski center connects to 100 kilometres (62 mi) of cross-country skiing trails. It is popular for winter sports such as Telemark skiing, alpine skiing, snowboarding, slalom skiing, cross-country skiing, as well as hiking.

Gautefall Tourist Hotel, which lies adjacent to the ski resort, has fifty hotel rooms, an à la carte restaurant, bar, saunas, a swimming pool, and twelve rental apartments.

As of late 2017, Gautefall was home to between 1400 and 1500 vacation homes.

== Etymology ==
The name "Gautefall" derives from Old Norse and translates to “the river which flows over.” It may have referred to a local waterfall, the 20-metre (66 ft) high Kjerringfossen by Bjorvatnet.

== History ==
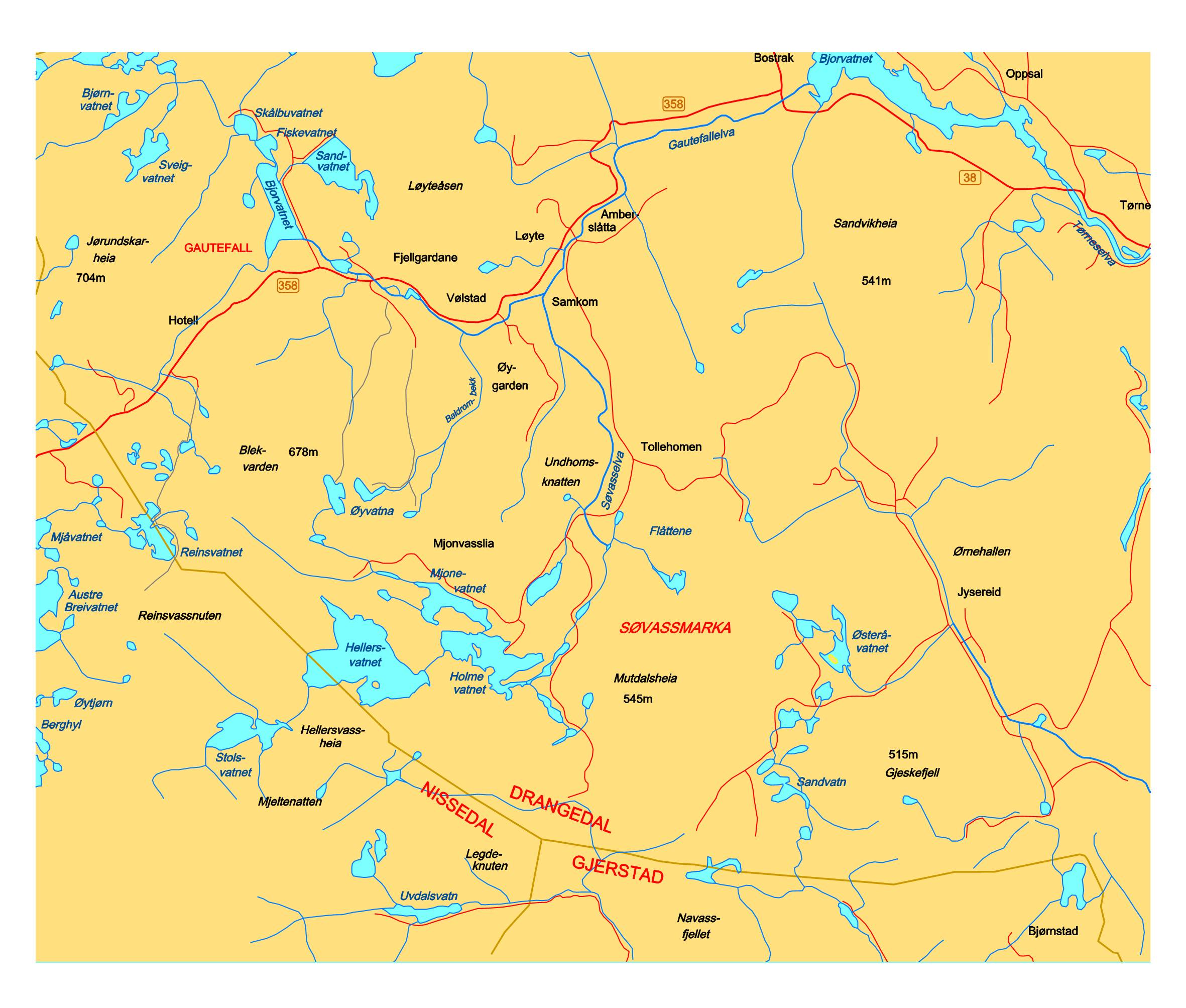
Map of Gautefall and surrounding areas

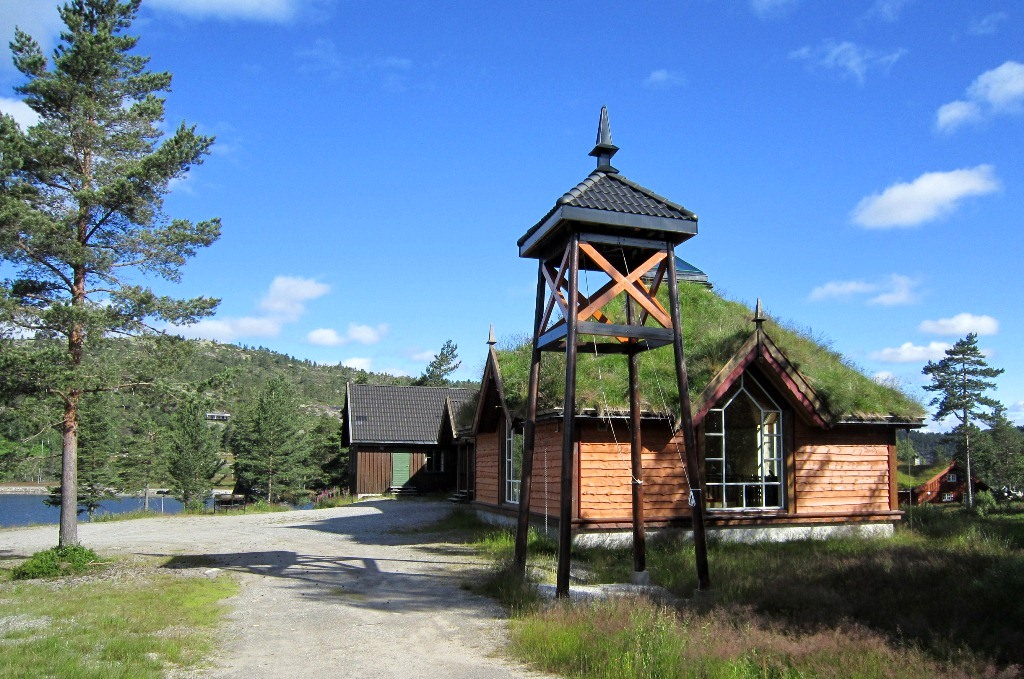
The mountain church Gautefall fjellkyrkje.

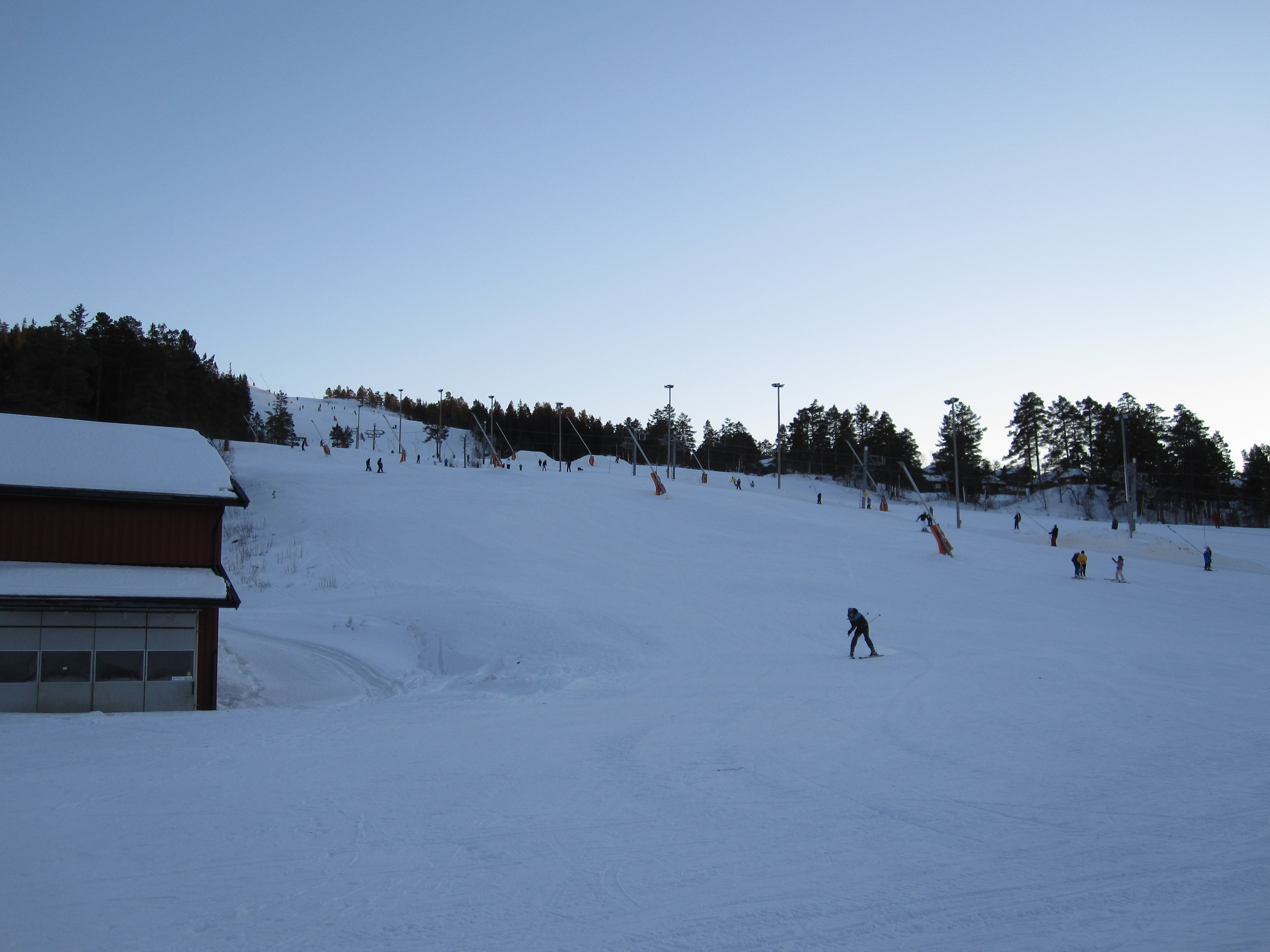
Slopes at Gautefall Ski Center

Near the lake Fiskevatnet, traces of ancient civilization dating back to the Iron Age or perhaps as early as Neolithic times, 4000–6000 years ago are visible. Ancient grave mounds can be seen in between the lakes Fiskevatnet and Skålbuvatnet. A large 18,500 decares (18.5 km^{2}; 7.1 sq mi) farm property here was purchased by a widow in 1393. The large property was later purchased by Nils Sørensen Adeler of Kragerø in the late 1600s. The oldest still-standing house by Fiskevatnet is the seter Seterstua which dates to the 1760s. The last year of shieling at Fiskevatnet was the summer of 1973, and the first vacation home was constructed here in 1957.

A solar symbol dating to the Bronze Age can be seen by Stolsvasslonene. This archeological monument dates to 1800 BCE-500 BCE and consists of a sun wheel which is roughly 40 centimetres (16 in) in diameter. At nearby Stolsvassøygard is where a twelve-year-old girl, Hæge Kyrkjebø, was killed by a Brown bear in July 1832.

The first cabin to be constructed at Gautefallheia was Reinsvasshytta, which was erected by Amboritius Olsen Lindvig by the year 1900 near Reinsvatn Lake. The cabin, which was constructed in the late 1890s, was inherited by Lindvig's son, Johannes Lindvig, who demolished the cabin and erected a new one in 1916. This cabin was later sold to the Hopstock family of Kragerø in 1931.

In 1934–1936, the cairn at Nonsåsheivarden (Blekavarden) was constructed by the Slokvik brothers.

Gautefalldammen, the dam above Kjerringfossen waterfall by Bjorvatnet Lake, was used as a floating dam for log driving, which took place here until May 1971. Nearby Kåsa (Hauktjennlikåsa) was cleared already in 1836 and was populated until 1923. It functioned as a seter for several years after. The road here was completed in 1973. A sawmill owned by Halvor Haugland was in operation by the lake Bjorvatnet from 1947 to 1950. Gautefalldammen was in use until 1971. It consisted of a 9.25-metre (30.3 ft) wide and 4-metre (13 ft) tall sluice gate along with nine hatches. The mill was removed in the early 1950s.

Until 1963, Gautefall was the highest farm located on a dead-end road on top of the mountain. Some tourists, particularly from Kragerø, began visiting the area due to its unique nature in the early 1900s. In the 1950s and 1960s, Gautefall also began drawing visitors for skiing from nearby Drangedal Municipality. When the construction of the road westwards was completed in 1964, the construction of vacation homes and cabins grew. The 1970s saw the establishment of Gautefall Tourist Hotel in 1973 and its nearby alpine center in 1976.

The 11-decare (0.011 km^{2}; 0.0042 sq mi) Gautefall Nature Preserve (Gautefall naturreservat) was established on 28 April 1978, in order to protect the temperate deciduous forest.

The mountain church, Gautefall fjellkyrkje, was constructed in 1997. In 2003, the artificial pond Nedre Langmyrtjenn was constructed adjacent to the church in order to provide water for the alpine center's snow canons. The church was expanded and re-consecrated on 20 June 2010.

In 2005, significant expansions took place at the alpine center. In 2007, the via ferrata trail at Hegneknuten mountain was established. In 2009, the 20-kilometre (12 mi) long Heigeitilløpya trail between Gautefall and Nissedal Municipality opened. 2009 also saw the establishment of Gautefall Biathlon, adjacent to Gautefall Ski Lodge.

== Geography ==
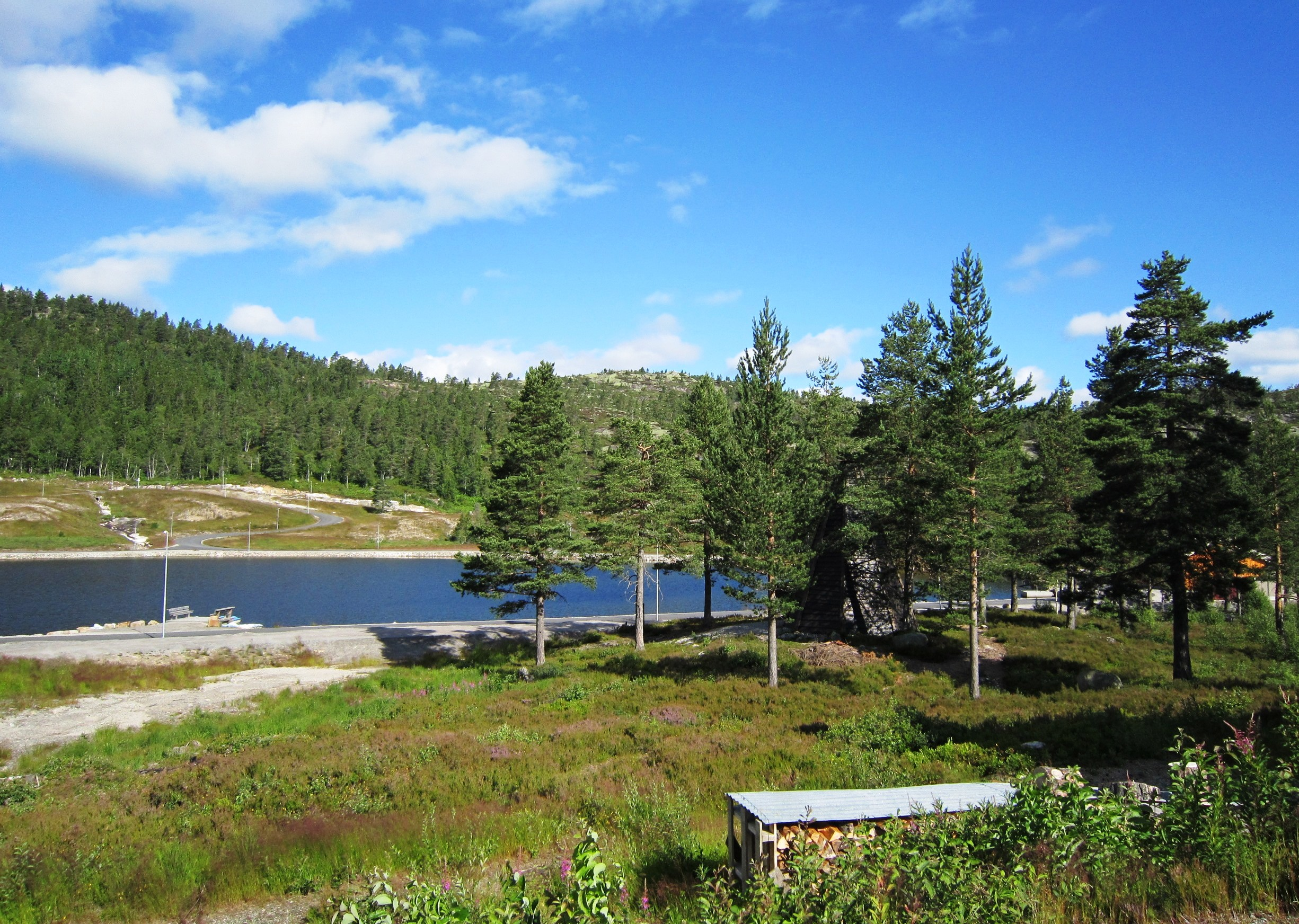
The lake Kvitbergstea.

Gautefall is a small mountain village located in rural Tørdal in the western portion of Drangedal Municipality in Telemark, Norway. It is transversed by county road 358, locally known as Gautefallveien. It is located at elevations between 500 and 700 metres (1,600 and 2,300 ft) above sea-level. It is mostly made up of heather moorland, mountains, forests, and lakes. Rivers include Svarthøl, Hegnebekken, Fantemobekken, Lauvdalsbekken, Gautefallelva, and others. Lakes include Nedre Langmyrtjenn, Langmyrtjenna, Blektjenna, Nedrekvitbergtjenna, Skattjenn, Bjorvatn, and others. Nature preserves include Gautefall Nature Preserve and Hellheia Nature Preserve.

Notable waterfalls include Kjerringfossen, Brudgomfossen, and Høgfoss. Kjerringfossen has a 20-metre (66 ft) drop and can be reached by following the old road towards Bostrak (Gamlevegen) from Ski Lodge Gautefall. A trail follows the river Fjellgårdselva to the waterfall by Bjorvatnet Lake. This road, which leads to Gautefallgårdene and Gautefall Nature Preserve, traverses Fantemoen and Eikestøa before reaching Bjorvatnet Lake where Kjerringfossen is located. The dam on top of the waterfall, Gautefalldammen, is one of the largest at Gautefallheia. From the bridge are traces visible from the log driving that took place here until 1971. Gautefall Nature Preserve is reached by following the old road to the county road (Fylkesvei 358) from the waterfall. The waterfall is also accessible by car and located roughly one kilometer northeast of Ski Lodge Gautefall. It is reached by following Fiskvannsveien towards Gautefall Panorama from the county road. Kjerringfossen is part of Gautefallelva (Gautefall River).

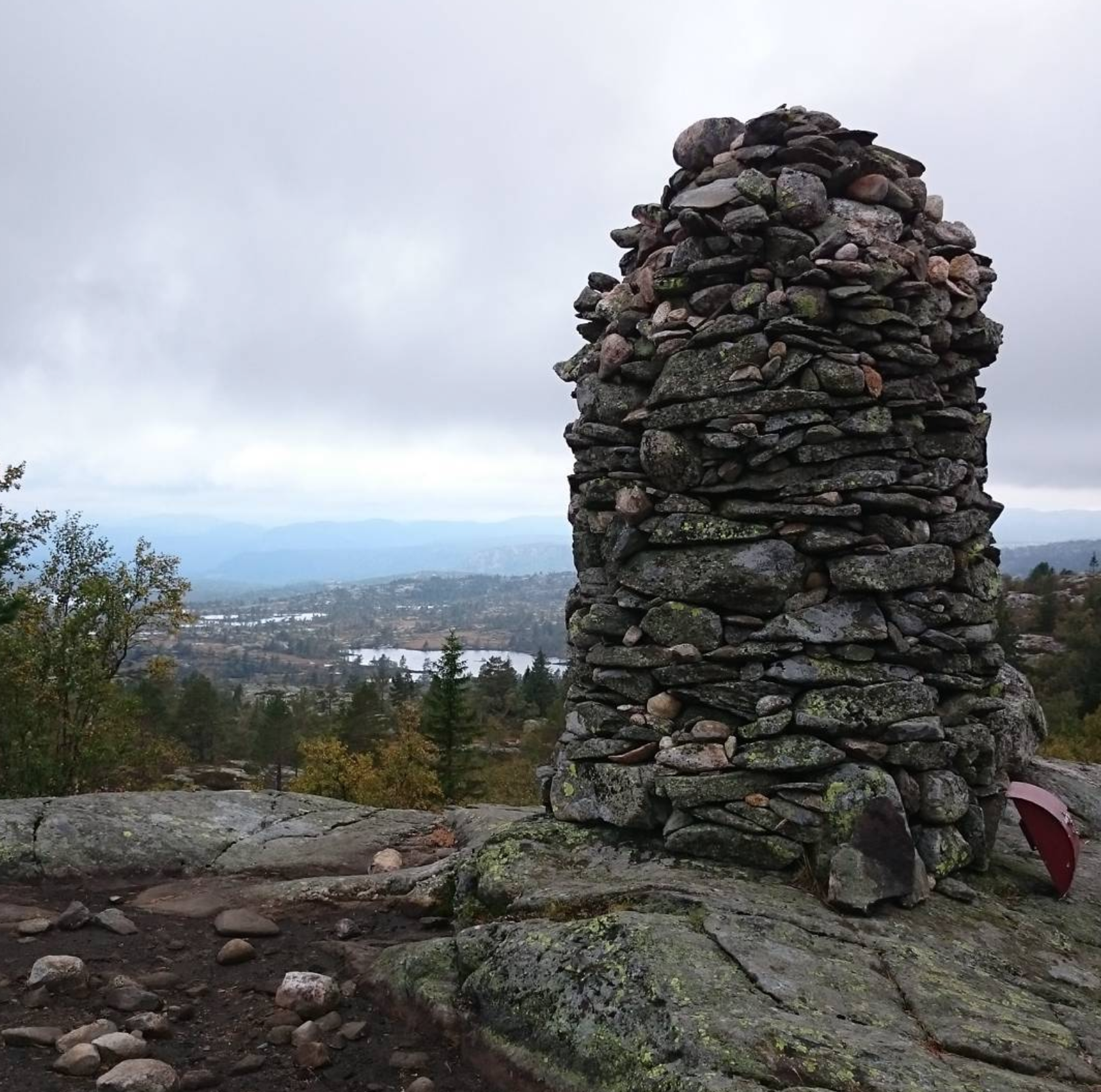
The cairn at Blekavarden (Nonsåsheivarden)

Rytterspranget is located immediately east of the top of the ski slopes at Gautefall Alpine Center. There is a road leading to the top of Rytterspranget where there is a cafe called Rytterspranget Kafé. A neighborhood of vacation homes and cabins have been constructed near the cafe. The cafe's wooden terrace offers panoramic views overlooking most of Gautefallheia. It offers views of Gautefall Tourist Hotel (built in 1973), the ski center (1976 and 2005), the church Gautefall fjellkyrkje (1997) as well as mountains such as Kvitbergheia and Jørundskarheia and lakes including Bjorvatnet and Fiskevatnet.

=== Bleka ===
Immediately south of the county road (Gautefallvegen) and the ski center is the hilltop and hillside area Bleka. The northern part of Bleka is known as Nonsåsheia, and centrally located at Nonsåsheia is a landmark cairn known as Nonsåsheiavarden (Blekavarden). This is located at 678 meters above sea level. A neighborhood of cabins has been constructed in the northwestern parts of Bleka. Bleka can be reached by parking at Rytterspranget or Søliane Hyttefelt. A number of hiking trails are found at Bleka and there is a number of overlook points found in the area. From Blekavarden there are views as far as to the ocean outside Kragerø and Risør in the south, the mountain Lifjell in the north, and the Vealøs Tower (Vealøstårnet) in Skien in the east. Hills in Fyresdal Municipality can be seen to the west. A number of lakes can be found at Bleka, including Store Daltjenn, Lille Daltjenn, Blekatjenn, Grunntjenn, and Skvetten.

=== Nature preserves ===
Gautefall Nature Preserve was established in 1978 with the purpose of protecting the low-herb oak forest. The reserve is located by county road 358 (Gautefallvegen), south of the Gautefall farm. The reserve is located at an elevation of 310 metres (1,020 ft) above the ocean. It is home to a variety of very large oak trees as well as species such as Common hazel, Rowan, and Small-leaved Lime. A variety of avifauna can be found in the preserve's oak tree groves, including Song thrush, European Blackbird, Common chaffinch, and European robin.

Hellehei (Hellheia) Nature Preserve was established in 1978 in order to preserve one of Norway's highest located oak tree forests. It is situated between 450 and 600 metres (1,480 and 1,970 ft) above sea-level on a steep hillside pointing southwest. The preserve is home to a particularly large oak tree but is also home to Birch, Maple, and Small-leaved Lime trees. It is located near Hellehei Hyttefelt, which is a neighborhood of cabins, in steep terrain roughly 400 metres (1,300 ft) north of county road 358.

Two additional nature preserves, Flottane and Nybutjern, are two wetlands located in Søvassmarka. These were designated nature preserves on 22 April 1983, and attracts wildlife such as moose, deer, and Black grouse. Flottane Nature Preserve is the largest of the two at 1.51 square kilometres (0.58 sq mi), while Nybutjern Nature Preserve is 0.32 square kilometres (79 acres). Both received protection due to their rich variety of vegetation and hydrotopography. They are of big importance for local avifauna and consists of bogland dominated by species such as Bog asphodel and Cross-leaved Heath. They are also home to species such as Orchids, Common milkworts, and Narrow-leaved marsh orchids. Nybutjern, which is situated north of Flottane, is largely made up of string bog.

== Culture ==
Gautefall Fjellkyrkje ("Gautefall mountain church") was established in 1997. It is centrally located near the ski center and is visible from the county road Gautefallvegen. It was established under Bamble prosti in 1997 but was expanded and completed in 2010, and consecrated on 20 June 2010, by bishop Olav Skjevesland. It is also used overnight as a camp for youth getting confirmed and other youth groups. It has two additional cabins at its disposal - Olavsbu and Stulsbu. Together they have accommodation for up to fifty people.

The Sputnik Festival was previously annually held at Gautefall for over fifteen consecutive years. The festival drew entertainers such as Sven O. Høiby, Cowboy-Laila, and Knut Storbukås. Sputnik, a Norwegian country music singer from neighboring Bostrak, began his career at the hotel in Gautefall. The Sputnik Museum is located in adjacent Bostrak.

== Alpine center ==
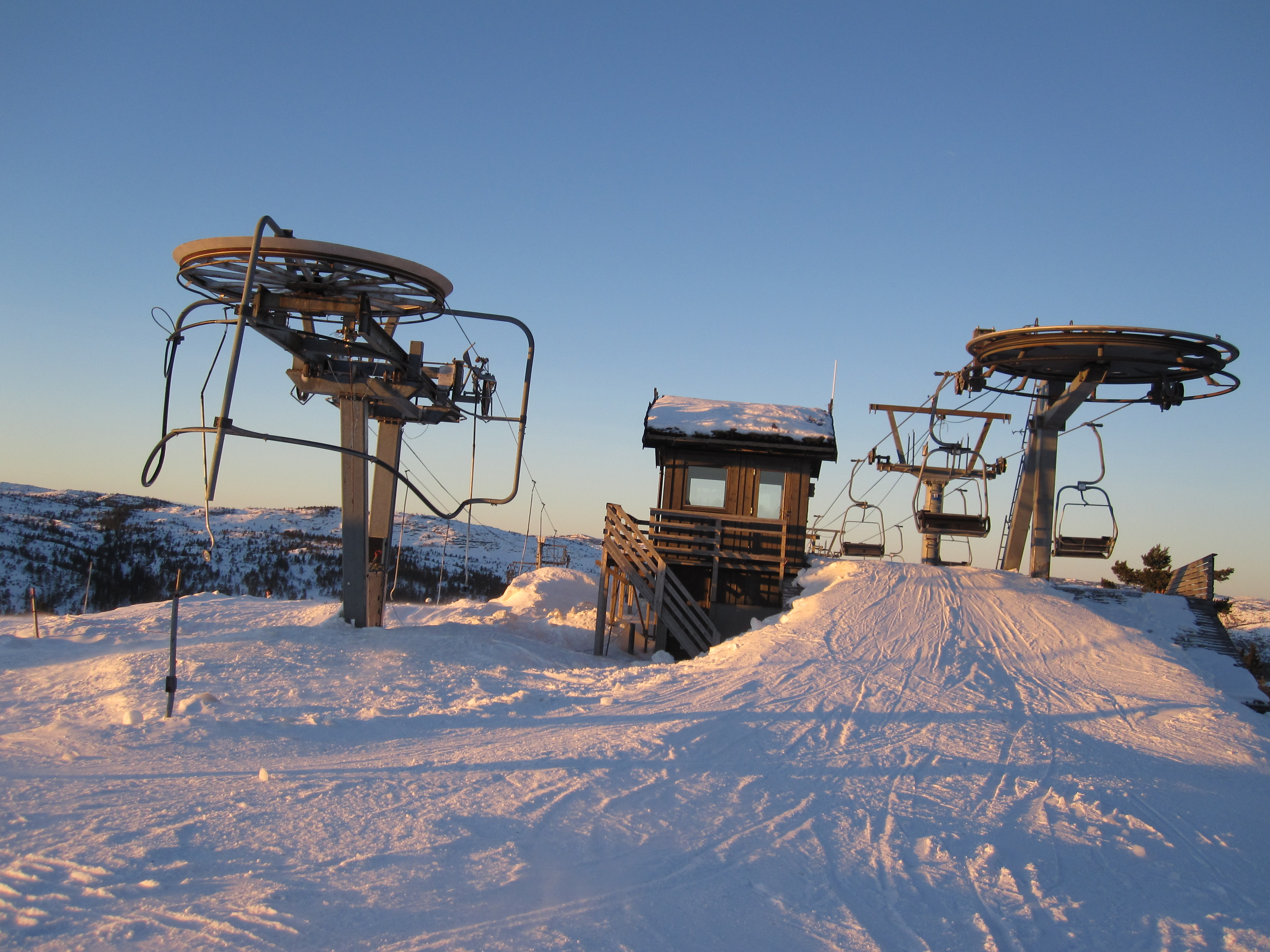
Ski lifts at Gautefall.

The alpine center at Gautefall lies across county road 358 from Gautefall Tourist Hotel (Gautefall Ski Lodge). It is located midway between Bostrak and Treungen and is visited by thousands every winter including both domestic and international visitors. It opened in 1976 but was expanded in 2005. It is one of the largest in Telemark with fifteen runs, one roll band, and seven chairlifts and surface lifts with a capacity of 7000 people per hour. It has 60 snow canons and is also home to a children's section with conveyor belts and a ski school with instructors speaking English, Swedish, Danish, among other languages. The center also offers ski rentals (alpine, cross country, and Telemark), instruction, as well as snowblade and snowboard rentals. It has sixteen slopes for alpine skiing and snowboarding as well as 100 kilometres (62 mi) of marked and lighted cross-country skiing trails. The longest slope is 1,200 metres (3,900 ft) and there is a total of 13.4 kilometres (8.3 mi) of available slopes. In 2019, the alpine center was open from December 1 through April 21 with an average snowfall of 200 centimetres (79 in).

The Red Cross operates a facility near Gautefall Fjellkyrkje at the bottom of the ski slopes. It is staffed during weekends in the wintertime as well as during the Easter and winter holidays. Emergency services on site are offered by Drangedal Red Cross.

Gautefall Biathlon was launched in 2009, and numerous regional and international competitions take place at the center. The biathlon facility has 31 slices, floodlights, and 4.2 kilometres (2.6 mi) of lighted asphalt trails. The facilities are used for lighted cross-country skiing trails during winters, while they are used for rollerskating during the summer months.

== Recreation ==
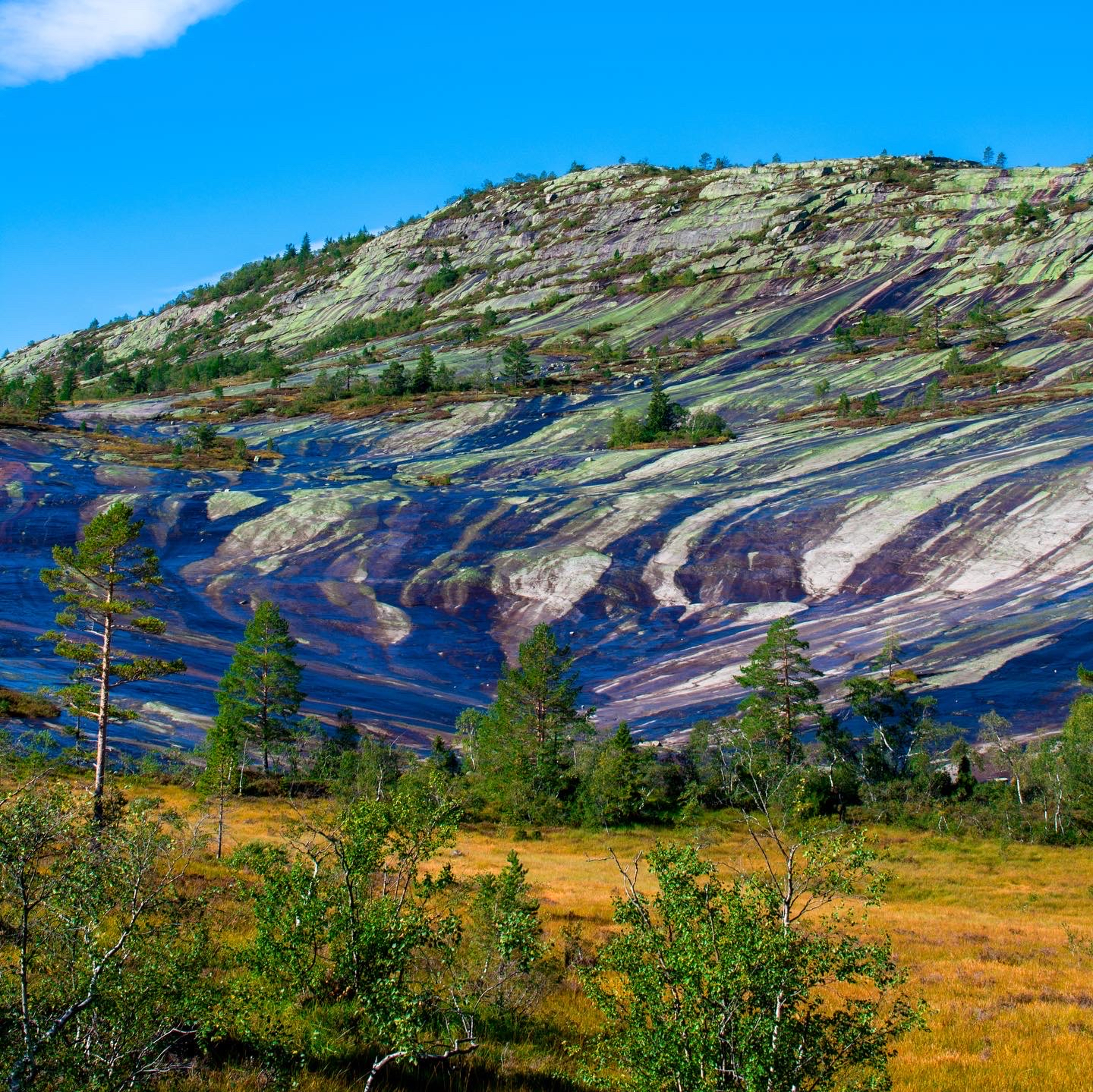
Himmelriket is also known as Jørundskårheia.

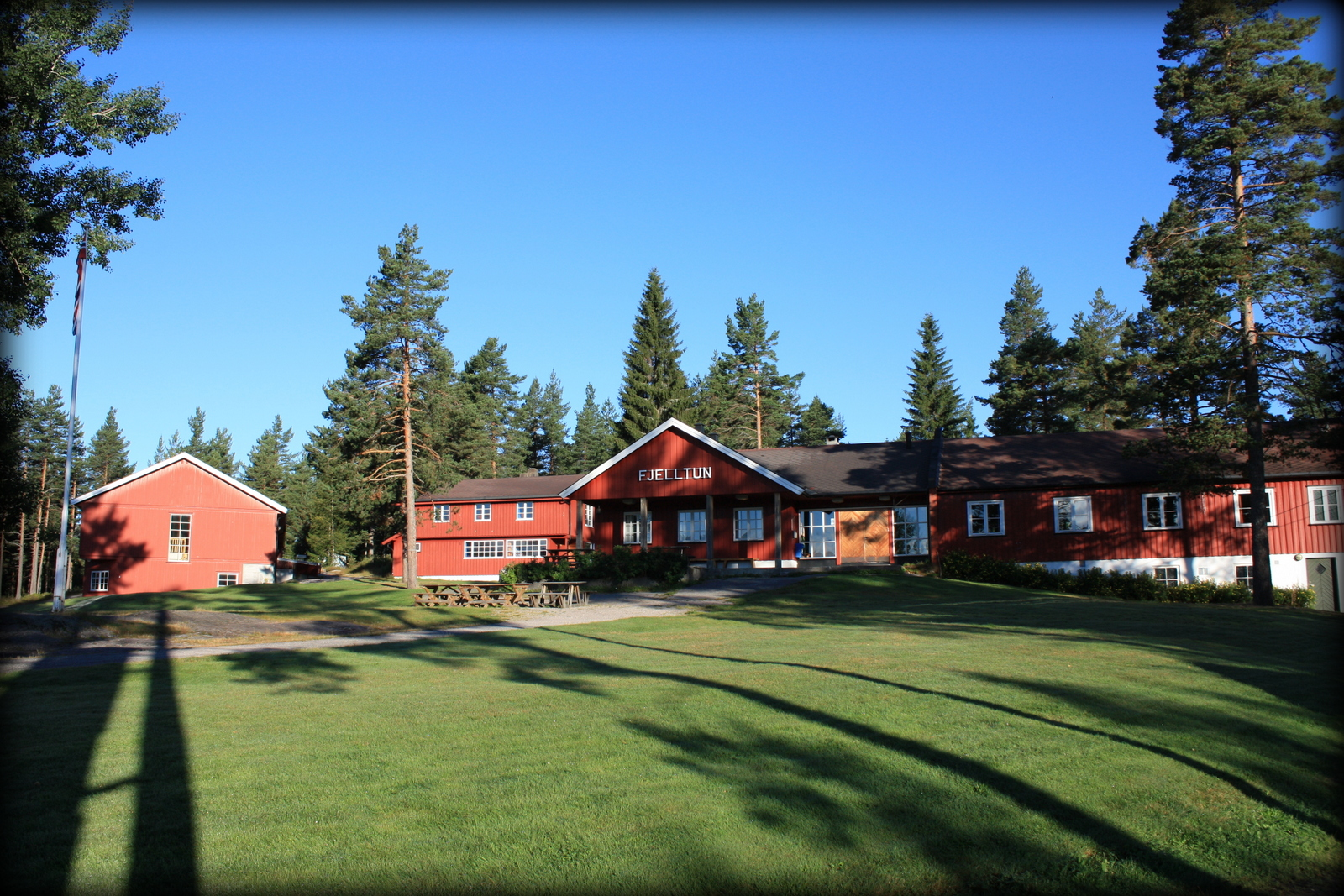
Fjelltun Youth Center and Camp.

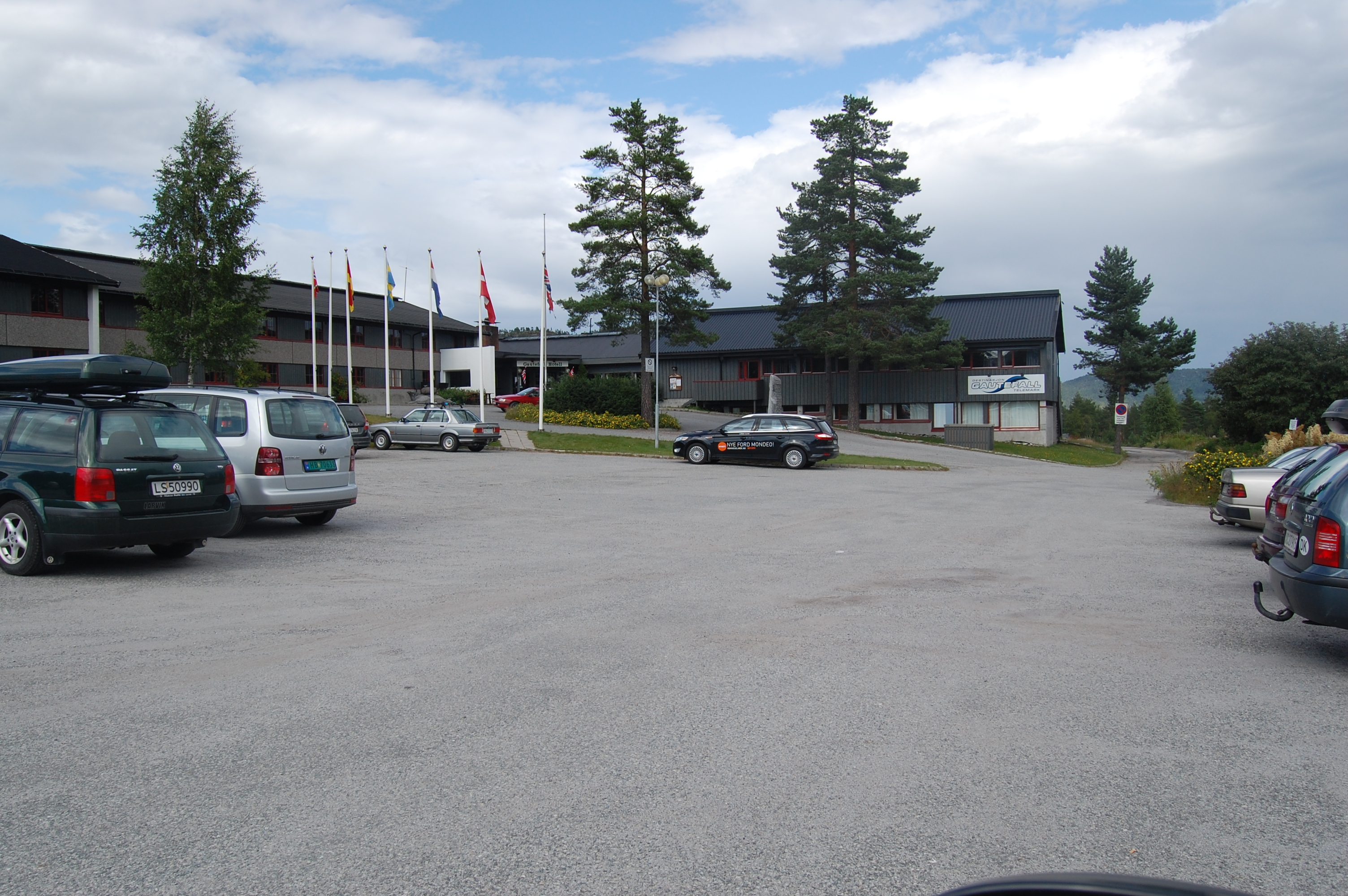
Gautefall Ski Lodge

Gautefall is home to numerous hiking trails, including Havrefjelløypa and Heigeitilløypa, two trails connecting Gautefall with Nissedal Municipality. The 20-kilometre (12 mi) long Heigeitilløpya trail was opened in 2009 and connects Gautefall with Holmevatn Lake at Kyrkjebygdheia in the north, while the 6-kilometre (3.7 mi) roundtrip Havrefjelløypa trail leads to the peak at Havrefjell mountain. Several trailheads can be found by the Gautefall Skicenter, including the trail to Himmelriket (Jørundskarsvåene), which is marked by blue poles from the hotel. The 3.9-kilometre (2.4 mi) long trail to Himmelriket ("Heavenly Kingdom") takes about one hour and leads to a roche moutonnée rock formation created by a glacier during the last ice age. The smooth granite sheepback is tens of thousands of years old and reached around 2.5 kilometres (1.6 mi) from the hotel. There is also a large abandoned bearcave located here. The trail to Himmelriket traverses vegetationless areas, mountains, pine tree groves, and heath oases before reaching large, smooth, glacial granite slopes. It is one of the most popular hiking trails at Gautefallheia.

Other trails from the hotel include Jørundskarheia, which also has its trailhead by Nedre Langmyrtjern lake near the church Gautefall fjellkyrkje, and Bleka (Nonsåsheivarden) with its trailhead at Rytterspranget Kafé on top of the ski slope. Additional trails include the 7-kilometre (4.3 mi) long Reinsvassnuten, a peak which offers panoramic views of Heimdalsheia, residential areas, wilderness, and as far as the ocean outside Kragerø. The trail, which is maintained by the Norwegian Trekking Association, follows birch and pine tree forests and hikers swim and fish at the nearby Reinsvatn Lake. The hike can be made shorter by accessing the trail from Bleka or Bjønntjønn ("Bear Lake") in neighboring Nissedal Municipality.

From Bleka there is a trailhead for the trail to Holmtjennheia, a trail popular for fly fishing, berry picking, and hunting. This trail offers panoramic views of surrounding areas and lies adjacent to a number of lakes, including Store Daltjenn, Holmtjenn, Grunntjenn, and Lille Daltjenn. The trailhead for the peak Nonsåsheivarden (Blekavarden) can be found at Rytterspranget, on top of the ski slope, reaching 678 metres (2,224 ft) above sea level. This peak offers views as far as Skagerrak, Risør, and Kragerø, along with mountain peaks such as Jonsknuten, Lifjell, Vealøs, Mælefjell, Skorve, and Setesdalsheiene. The trail to Øyvann Lake is also reached from Rytterspranget.

Gautefall Event is a company that offers snowmobile safari tours, guided ski trips, horseback riding, mountain hikes, and other recreational activities. Gautefall Skifestival is held every year with a variety of ski competitions.

=== Mountain climbing ===
For mountain climbing, adjacent Nissedal is home to Hægefjell, a popular destination for mountain climbing. In Gautefall proper, Jernveien (via ferrata) is a site by Hegneknuten where 165 iron steps have been bolted into the mountainside making a 170-metre (560 ft) climb to the peak. The mountain, Hegneknuten, is located one kilometer east of the ski center near Hegnemyrane. This mountain trail was opened in 2007 and climbers can rent instructors and equipment at the resort.

=== Fishing ===
Over a thousand lakes can be found at or near Gautefallheia. Many of these are used for fishing for species such as Brown trout, European perch, and Brook trout. Fishing licenses are sold throughout the area at local gas stations, shops, and by gates near fishing lakes. Adjacent Nissedal Municipality is home to 1,750 lakes, and many are used for fishing, boating, kayaking, swimming, and other recreational activities. Nissedal is also home to Lake Nisser, which is the largest lake in Telemark County. Fish species in Lake Nisser include Perch, Trout, Lavaret, and Arctic char.

=== Hunting ===
There are long traditions for hunting at Gautefallheia and nearby Nissedal Municipality, Drangedal Municipality, and Gjerstad Municipality. Bird and rabbit hunting were previously most common, however, moose hunting is the most popular form of hunting in this area today. There is also some hunting taking place for lynx and deer. Small game such as beavers and deer are commonly hunted along Nissedal's southern border with Gjerstad Municipality, while rabbit hunting is common near Ljosvassteigen on the border with Gjerstad Municipality and Vegårshei Municipality. Gjerstadskogene by Solhomfjell is a popular site for those hunting birds, rabbits, beavers, and deer.

== Wildlife ==
Wildlife includes the Mountain hare, European beaver, European pine marten, Norway lemming, European badger, Roe deer, Red deer, Moose, Red fox, European hedgehog, Wolverine, Short-tailed weasel, and European otter. The area is particularly known for its high moose population. The Eurasian lynx, Brown bear, and Gray wolf are occasionally observed. Reptiles include the European Viper, European smooth snake, European grass snake, and the Slowworm.

Raptors include the Golden eagle, European eagle-owl, Eurasian pygmy owl, Merlin, Northern goshawk, Common buzzard, Western Osprey, and various other species of owls, falcons, eagles, and hawks. Other notable avifauna includes the Western capercaillie, Black grouse, Willow ptarmigan, Hazel grouse, Common crane, Black-throated loon, Lesser spotted woodpecker, White-backed woodpecker, Common sandpiper, Wood sandpiper, Mallard, Common goldeneye, Eurasian teal, Common scoter, Common redshank, Common snipe, Eurasian woodcock, Western yellow wagtail, and the national bird of Norway, the White-throated dipper.

== Places of interest ==
- Gautefall Ski Lodge, a local ski resort
- Gautefall Skicenter, an alpine center
- Gautefall fjellkyrkje, a church building
- Rytterspranget, an overlook point
- Himmelriket (Jørundskarsvåene), a roche moutonnée rock formation
- Gautefall Nature Preserve, a temperate deciduous forest
- Lille Djupsånfjellet, a 558-metre (1,831 ft) high mountain, nicknamed "Gautefallheia's Preikestolen".
