= Bletoppen =

Mountain in Telemark, Norway

Bletoppen Store Ble
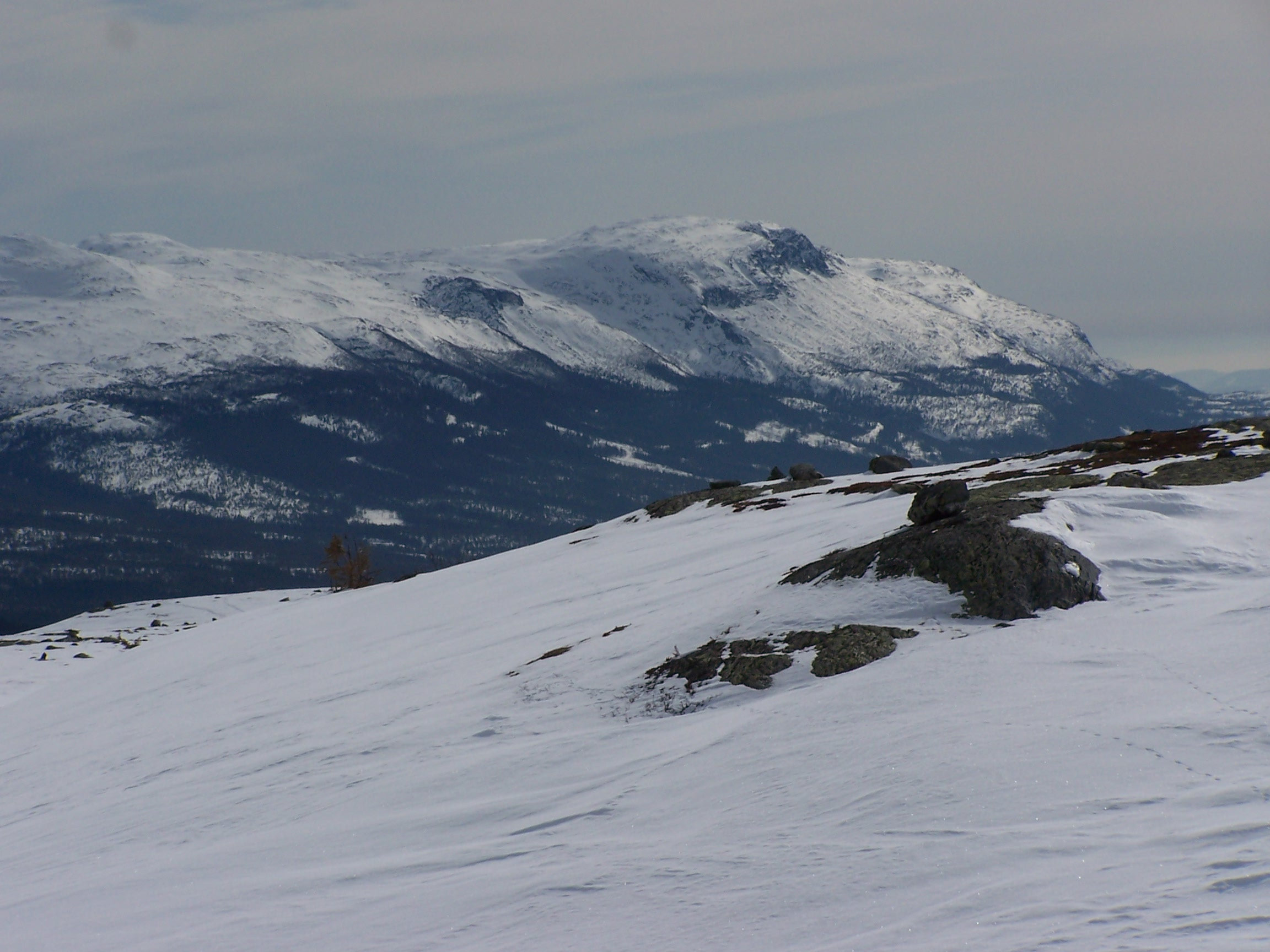

Highest point
- Elevation: 1,340 m (4,400 ft)
- Prominence: 540 m (1,770 ft)
- Isolation: 41 metres (135 ft) to Heddersfjell
- Coordinates: 59°48′28″N 9°09′10″E

Geography
- Location: Telemark, Norway
- Parent range: Blefjell
- Topo map: 1618 I Tinnsjå

Bletoppen or Store Ble is a mountain in Tinn Municipality in Telemark county, Norway. The 1,340-metre (4,400 ft) tall mountain is located about 10 kilometres (6.2 mi) southeast of the village of Hovin and about 30 kilometres (19 mi) north of the town of Notodden. The mountain is the highest mountain in the Blefjell mountain range which lies on the border of Telemark and Buskerud.

From the summit, there is a view of Jonsknuten and Skrimfjella in the southeast, Lifjell in the southwest, Gaustatoppen in the west, and Hardangervidda in the northwest.

The summit is most easily reached by following a marked trail from the parking lot at Nordstul, a 3 to 4 hour hike in the summer. Numerous shorter paths start at the road to Fosskard and go up the steep western side of Blefjell.

== See also ==
- List of mountains of Norway by height
