= Bø, Drangedal =

Village in Drangedal Municipality, Norway

Bø Bø i Tørdal
- Village
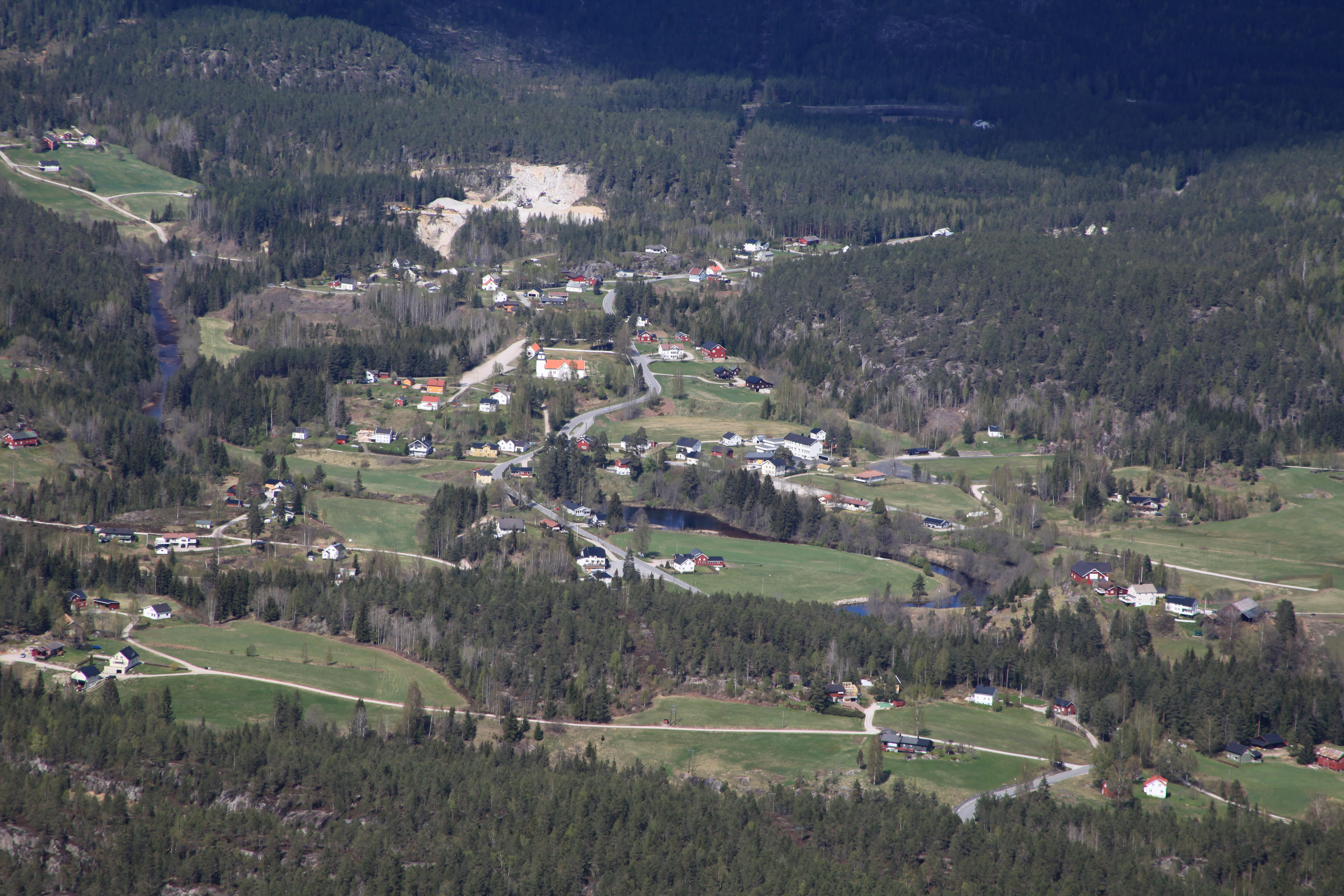
- View of the village
- Interactive map of the village
- Coordinates: 59.15388°N 8.8123°E
- Country: Norway
- Region: Eastern Norway
- County: Telemark
- Municipality: Drangedal Municipality
- Elevation: 94 m (308 ft)
- Time zone: UTC+01:00 (CET)
  - Summer (DST): UTC+02:00 (CEST)
- Post Code: 3753 Tørdal

Bø is a village in Drangedal Municipality in Telemark county, Norway. The village is located at the northern end of the lake Bjorvann in the Tørdal area in northern Drangedal. It is located about 7 kilometres (4.3 mi) to the northwest of the village of Bostrak and about 12 kilometres (7.5 mi) to the northeast of the village of Gautefall. Tørdal Church is located in the village.
