= Treungen =

Village in Nissedal, Norway

Treungen Tveitsund
- Village
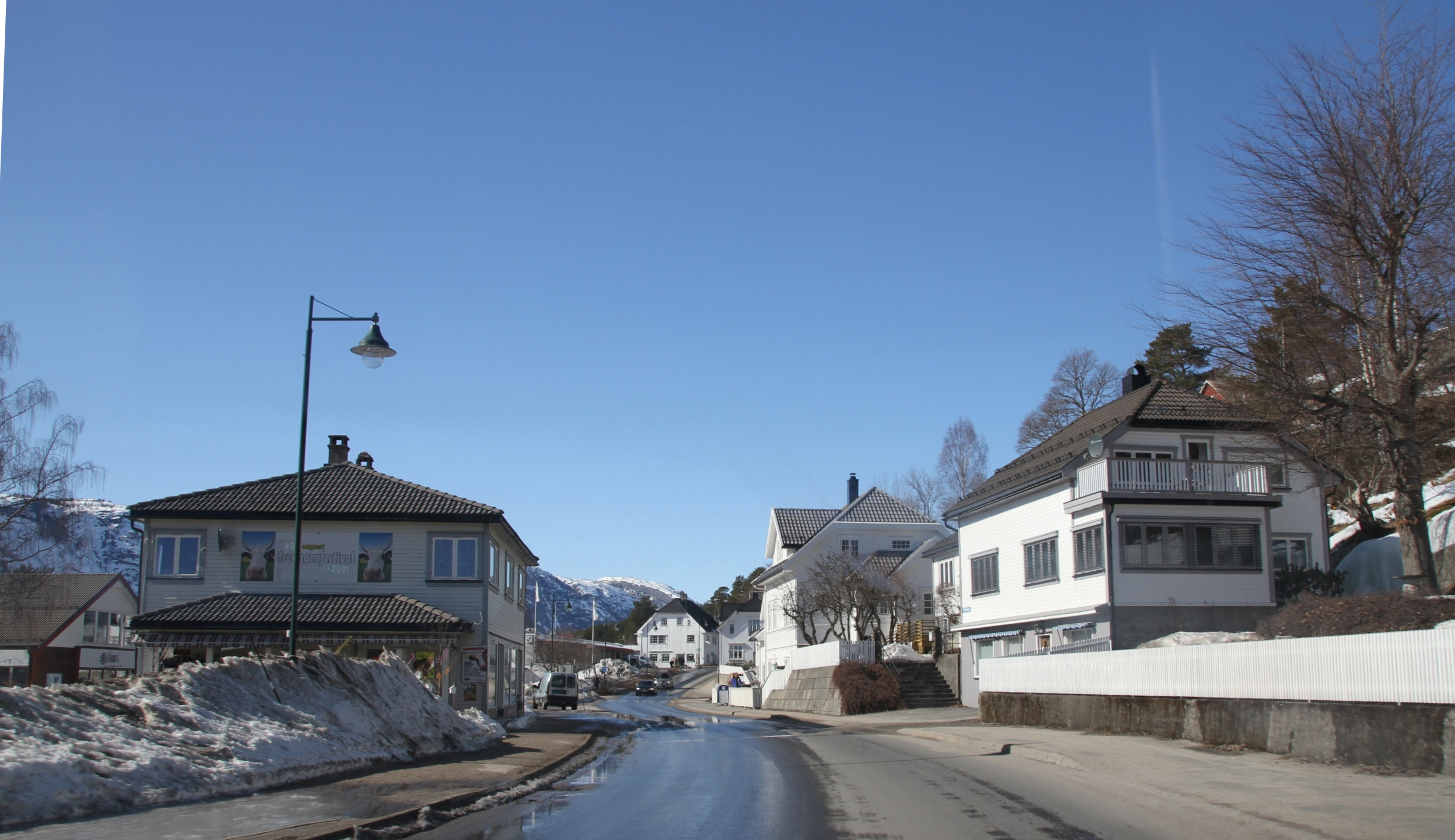
- View of the village
- Interactive map of Treungen
- Coordinates: 59.02064°N 8.5202°E
- Country: Norway
- Region: Eastern Norway
- County: Telemark
- District: Vest-Telemark
- Municipality: Nissedal Municipality

Area
  - Total: 1.03 km^{2} (0.40 sq mi)
- Elevation: 247 m (810 ft)

Population (2025)
  - Total: 571
  - Density: 554/km^{2} (1,430/sq mi)
- Time zone: UTC+01:00 (CET)
  - Summer (DST): UTC+02:00 (CEST)
- Post Code: 3855 Treungen

Treungen or Tveitsund is the administrative centre of Nissedal Municipality in Telemark county in Norway. Treungen and Tveitsund were previously separate villages, but they have grown together and now form one large urban area. The 1.03-square-kilometre (250-acre) village has a population (2025) of 571 and a population density of 554 inhabitants per square kilometre (1,430/sq mi). The village is the sole population centre that has more than 200 residents in all of Nissedal municipality.

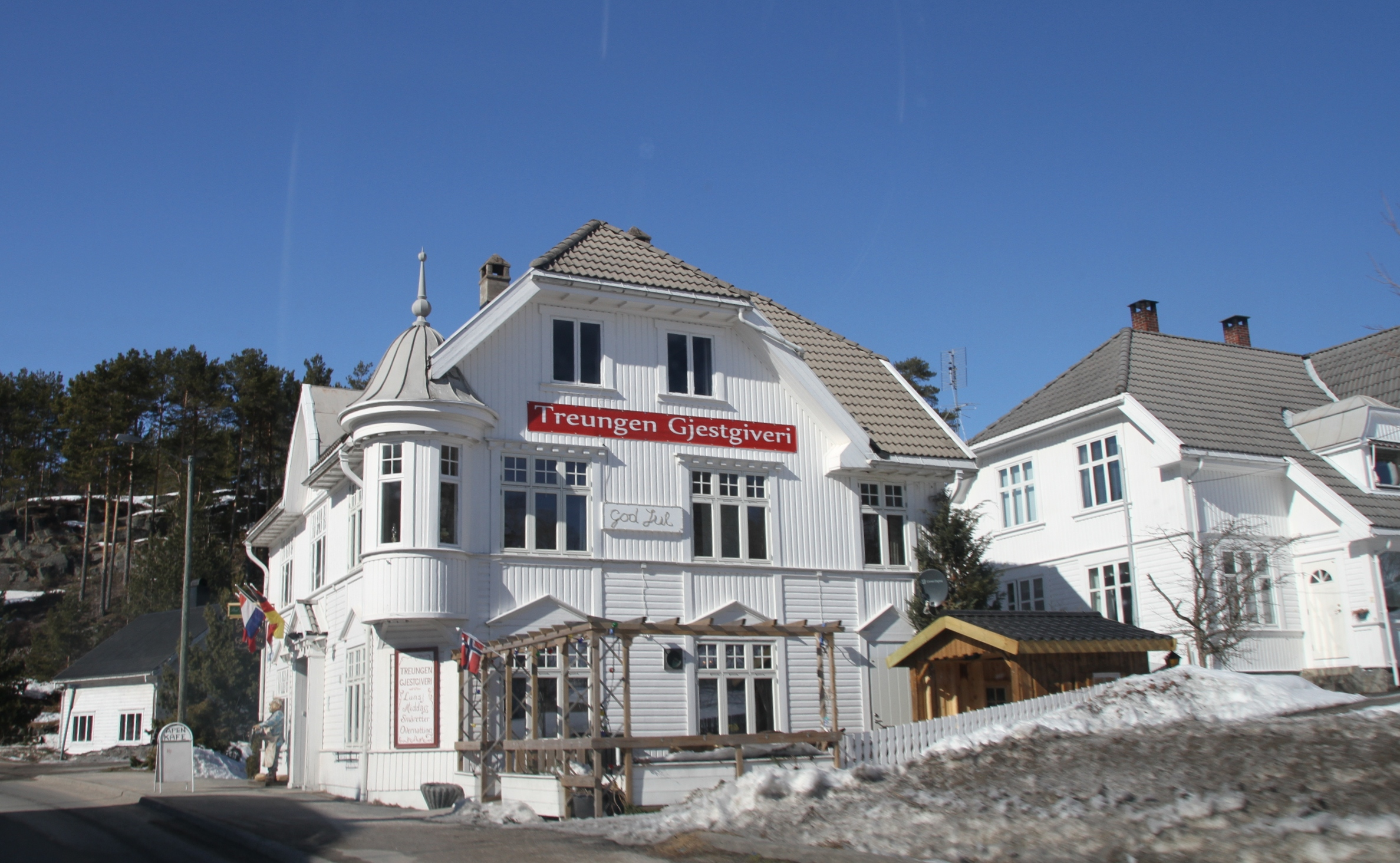
Local hotel

Treungen is surrounded by tall mountains and is situated where the river Nidelva begins at the southernmost part of the lake Nisser, Telemark's largest lake. Immediately south of Treungen is the lake Tjørull, Nissedal's second-largest lake. Rivers in the Treungen area include Fyresåna and Nisseråna, which both intersect to the south of the village.

The Old Norse name for Treungen was «Þriðjungrinn», meaning "a third part" and probably refers to an old division of the village.

The local hotel is a building that is characteristic of Treungen's early days as a travel interchange between road and railway. The hotel is built in the Jugendstil architectural style, adorned with classical columns.

== Location ==
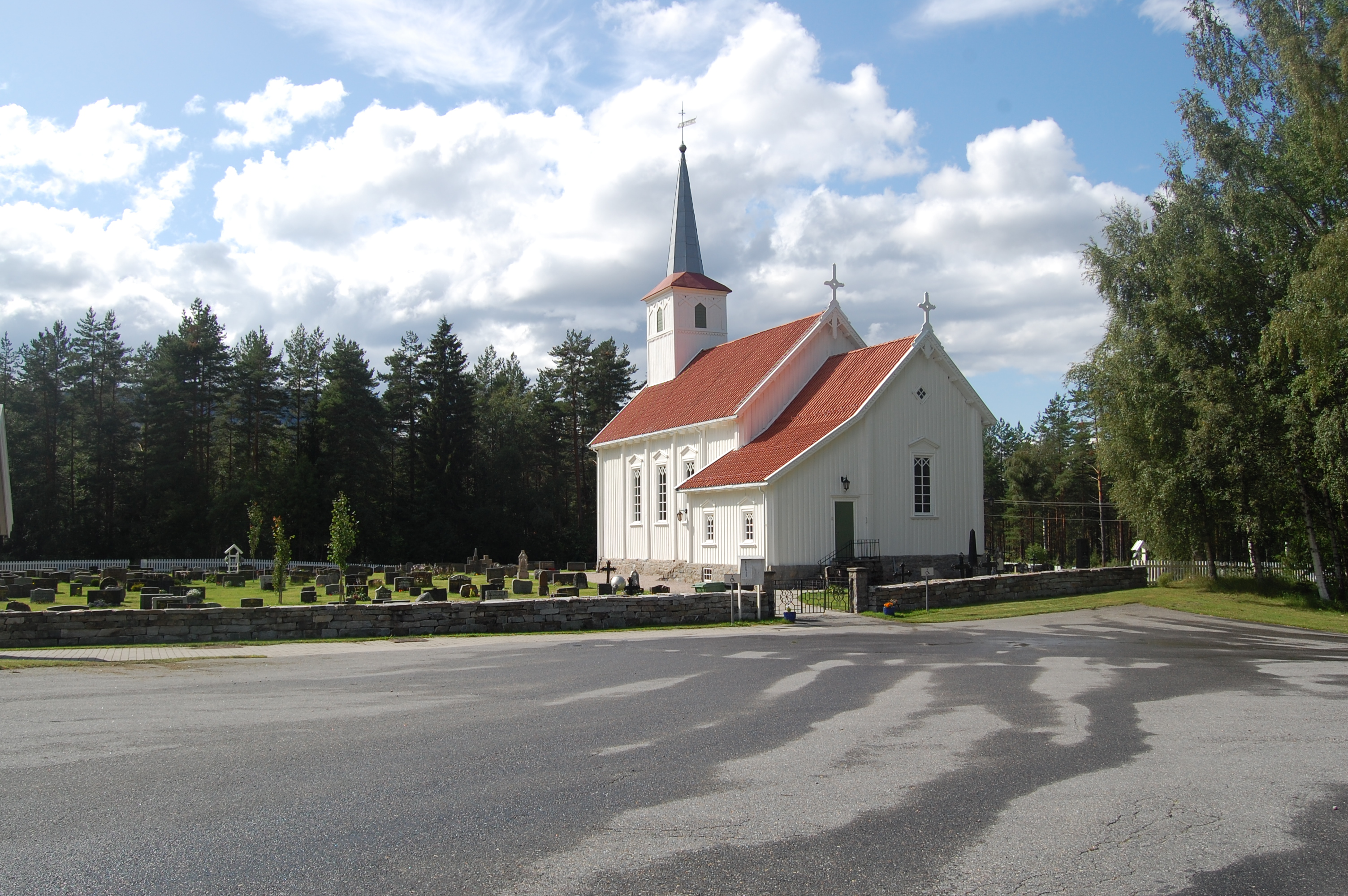
Treungen Church was consecrated on March 25, 1863. Its altarpiece dates to 1751.

Treungen lies beside the southern end of lake Nisser, about 18 kilometres (11 mi) south of the village of Kyrkjebygda and about 20 kilometres (12 mi) to the northwest of the village of Felle. The Telemarksveien (Norwegian National Road 41) passes through the village northwards towards Vrådal and southwards towards Åmli Municipality in Agder county. The state highway was widened after the Treungen railway was dismantled in 1967. Treungen was the railway terminus. Telemark Bilruter runs a bus route between Arendal and Seljord, and this route replaces the abandoned rail connection to Arendal. Treungen is split into two by lake Nisser and in the middle of the village is Tveitsund bridge, a fine stone bridge adorned with concrete columns. The bridge was protected as a cultural monument in 1999. It is small, and traffic is controlled by lights. Throughout its history, Treungen has been closely linked with the town of Arendal and Agder county because lake Nisser was a part of the Arendal waterway and had its outflow through Nidelva. When timber was floated downriver, Treungen was an important hub. The timber came here along lake Nisser before being sent on its journey to Arendal.

== Climate ==
Treungen has a warm-summer humid continental climate (Köppen: Dfb), with cold winters and mild summers.

Climate data for Tveitsund 1991-2020 (252 m, extremes 1919-2021 includes earlier station)
Month	Jan	Feb	Mar	Apr	May	Jun	Jul	Aug	Sep	Oct	Nov	Dec	Year
Record high °C (°F)	12.5 (54.5)	16.3 (61.3)	19.4 (66.9)	22.5 (72.5)	28.1 (82.6)	31.8 (89.2)	31.8 (89.2)	31.8 (89.2)	26.4 (79.5)	22.8 (73.0)	15.1 (59.2)	12.8 (55.0)	31.8 (89.2)
Mean daily maximum °C (°F)	1.3 (34.3)	1.8 (35.2)	5.4 (41.7)	10.1 (50.2)	15.5 (59.9)	19.5 (67.1)	21.7 (71.1)	20.3 (68.5)	15.7 (60.3)	9.6 (49.3)	4.8 (40.6)	1.9 (35.4)	10.6 (51.1)
Daily mean °C (°F)	−2 (28)	−2.1 (28.2)	0.5 (32.9)	4.6 (40.3)	9.5 (49.1)	13.6 (56.5)	15.9 (60.6)	14.7 (58.5)	11 (52)	5.9 (42.6)	1.9 (35.4)	−1.1 (30.0)	6.0 (42.8)
Mean daily minimum °C (°F)	−4.9 (23.2)	−5.3 (22.5)	−3.5 (25.7)	0.1 (32.2)	4 (39)	8.1 (46.6)	10.8 (51.4)	10.2 (50.4)	7.2 (45.0)	2.8 (37.0)	−0.6 (30.9)	−3.9 (25.0)	2.1 (35.7)
Record low °C (°F)	−27.5 (−17.5)	−34.6 (−30.3)	−26.6 (−15.9)	−15 (5)	−4.8 (23.4)	−1.3 (29.7)	1.9 (35.4)	1 (34)	−3.9 (25.0)	−11.2 (11.8)	−17.3 (0.9)	−23 (−9)	−34.6 (−30.3)
Average precipitation mm (inches)	89.1 (3.51)	56.7 (2.23)	50.3 (1.98)	49.5 (1.95)	72.4 (2.85)	79.1 (3.11)	93.7 (3.69)	110 (4.3)	99 (3.9)	114.1 (4.49)	107.7 (4.24)	85.8 (3.38)	1,007.4 (39.63)
Average precipitation days (≥ 1.0 mm)	13	10	9	9	9	10	11	11	11	12	13	12	130
Source 1: yr.no statistics Tveitsund
Source 2: NOAA-WMO averages 91-2020 Norway

== Recreation ==
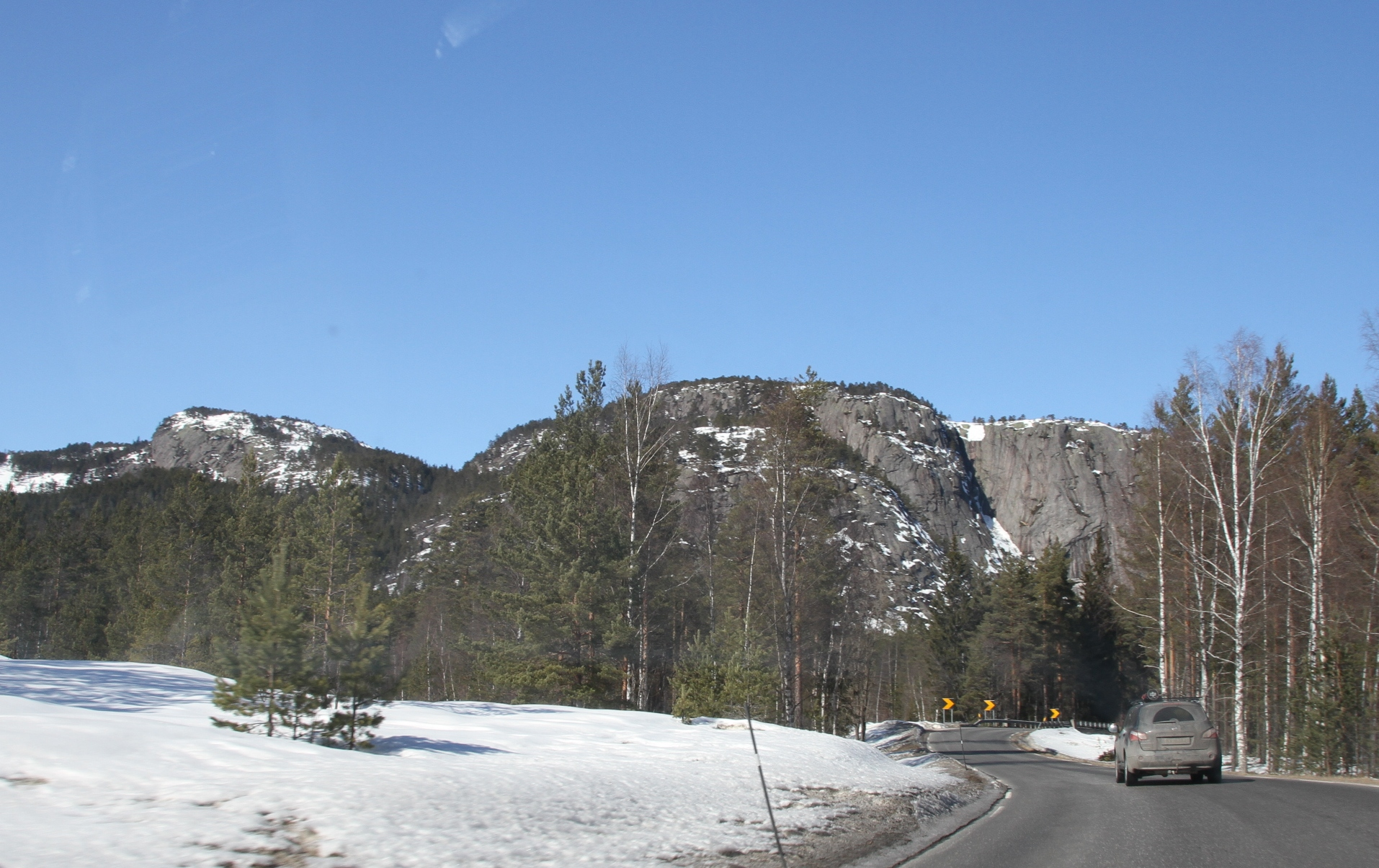
The mountain Skuggenatten is a Treungen landmark.

Treungen and the surrounding areas in Nissedal Municipality are home to a variety of hiking trails, including Havrefjelløypa and Heigeitilløypa, two trails connecting Nissedal with neighboring Gautefall. Various nearby mountain peaks offer hiking trails, including Hægefjell, Skornetten, and Skuggenatten. The trailhead for Skuggenatten (western peak of Baremslandsfjell) is located by Treungen sports arena, around 1 kilometre (0.62 mi) south of Treungen village center. Its peak at 706 metres (2,316 ft) above sea-level has panoramic views of surrounding areas including the village and adjacent lake Nisser. Skuggenatten has been called the symbol of Treungen and is located near the village center. A cabin, cairn, and a mast can be found on top. The trailhead is situated on the opposite side of the road from Treungen Fire Station. Skuggenatten is the most popular mountain for hiking in the Treungen area. The trails here are also the best-marked hiking trails in Nissedal.

The trailhead for Skornetten, the highest point in Kyrkjebygdheia at 883 metres (2,897 ft) above sea-level, is situated by the seter at Espeli on the eastern side of Holmevatn and Breilivatn. From the trail are panoramic views of Breilivatn, Sylvtjønn, Breili, Holmevatn, Nordbygda, Tørdal, Gautefallheia, and more. From the peak are views of Fyresdal, Vrådal, Kviteseid, Seljord, Hesthomvarden, Hjasufsknatten, and as far as Risør and the ocean outside Kragerø.

A number of trailheads can be found by Bjønntjønn ("Bear Lake") in Bjønntjønndalen ("Bear Valley"), including trails to Reinsvassnuten, Øverlandsvatnet, Gautefall Tourist Hotel, Heimdalsheia, and a lavvo at Breivassåsen by the lake Østre Breivatn. Several trailheads by Bjønntjønn can be found by the dam, Bjønntjønndammen, a floating dam which was constructed by Sveinung Solli in 1900. The dam was in use until the 1960s and was restored by Gautefall Turlag in 2010. Various cross-country skiing trails were established near Bjønntjønn in 2008, including skiing trails to Gautefall Tourist Hotel and Bleka at Gautefallheia.

The trail to the peak at Reinvassnuten lies by Reinsvatn Lake where the oldest cabin at Gautefall can be found (Reinsvasshytta). Reinsvasshytta cabin was constructed by Amboritius Olsen Lindvig in 1900. Although the main trailhead for Reinsvassnuten is located at Gautefall Tourist Hotel, there are trailheads at Bleka in Gautefall as well as near the lakes Feletjønn and Bjønntjønn in Nissedal.

Lake Tjørull is located 10 kilometres (6.2 mi) south of Tjønnefoss in Treungen. The lake is home to a variety of islands and bays and is situated next to tall mountain peaks. It is used for a number of recreational activities such as canoeing, kayaking, fishing, swimming, rowing, and more. Wildlife such as eagles and beavers can often be seen by Tjørull.

== Notable people ==
- Jan Gunnar Solli, an international footballer.
