= Bostrak =

Village in Drangedal Municipality, Norway

Bostrak Bustrak (unofficial)
- Village
- Interactive map of the village
- Coordinates: 59.10995°N 8.88445°E
- Country: Norway
- Region: Eastern Norway
- County: Telemark
- District: Grenland
- Municipality: Drangedal Municipality
- Elevation: 105 m (344 ft)
- Time zone: UTC+01:00 (CET)
  - Summer (DST): UTC+02:00 (CEST)
- Post Code: 3750 Drangedal

Bostrak is a village in Drangedal Municipality in Telemark county, Norway. The village is located near the western shore of the lake Bjorvann in the Tørdal area of northern Drangedal. The village of Bø i Tørdal lies about 7 kilometres (4.3 mi) to the northwest, the village of Gautefall lies about 10 kilometres (6.2 mi) to the west, and the village of Prestestranda lies about 11 kilometres (6.8 mi) to the east.

== Notable people ==
- Country music singer Sputnik is from Bostrak and owns a home here.
