= Sputnik (singer) =

Norwegian musician (born 1943)

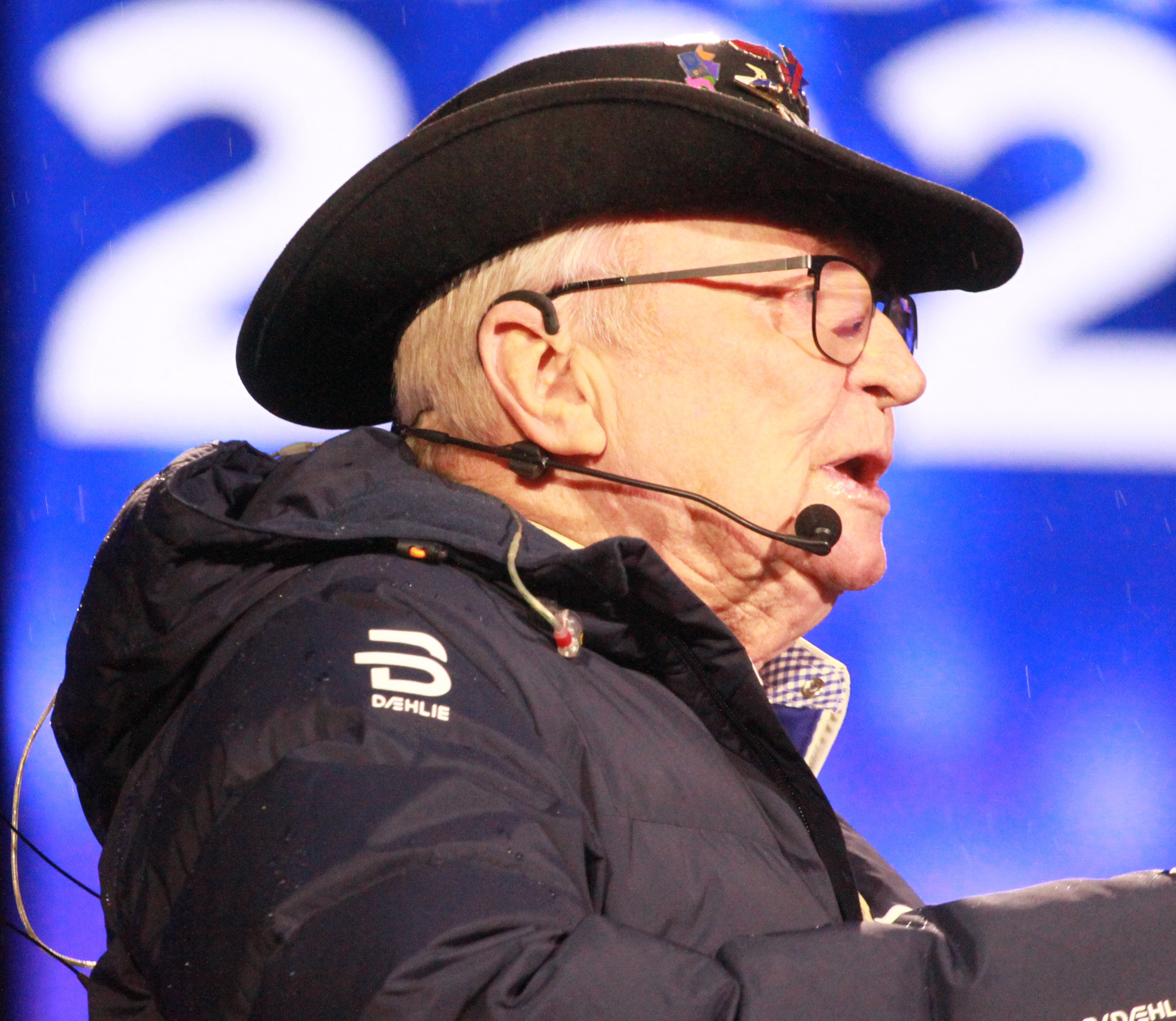
- Sputnik at the 2025 FIS Nordic World Ski Championships

Background information
- Born: Knut T. Storbukås; April 23, 1943 (age 83); Norway
- Instruments: Vocals, Guitar
- Years active: 1986 - present
- Website: http://www.sputnik.no/

Knut T. Storbukås (born 23 April 1943), more commonly known by his stage name, Sputnik, is a Norwegian musician and truck driver from Bostrak in the village of Tørdal in Drangedal Municipality, Telemark county. His most well known songs are "Skilles Johanne" (English: Separating from Johanne) and "Lukk opp din hjertedør" ("Open Up Your Heart (And Let the Sunshine In)").

In only a few years, Storbukås sold more than one million cassettes, and set records in a series of places where he performed. He was rated as artist of the year in Norway in 1990, and in the fall of 1993 he got into the Guinness Book of World Records when he performed 36 times in locations from Mandal in the south to Tromsø in the north in only 72 hours.

During Easter in 1990, he was in the Soviet Union and partook in a music video in the Red Square in Moscow. The video was later shown in its entirety in Norwegian on Dagsrevyen. Sputnik also contributed to the show during the opening of TV2 in Grieghallen in the fall of 1992, in a duet with Kjell Bækkelund.

He has also performed in Sweden, Denmark, the United States, Svalbard, Zanzibar, Spain and around all of Norway.

Sputnik has a large collection of silver, gold, diamond, and platinum records in his own Sputnik Museum.

== Discography ==
=== Albums ===
- Sputnik 1 (1986)
- Sputnik 2 (1986)
- Sputnik 3 (1987)
- Sputnik 4 (1988)
- Sputnik 5 (1989)
- Romjulsmusikken til Sputnik (1989)
- Sputnik 6 (1990)
- Sputnik 7 (1991)
- Den store festkassetten (1991)
- Sputnik 8 (1992)
- Bedehusmusikken til Sputnik (1993)
- Sputnik 9 (1994)
- Sputnik 10 (1995)
- Gull og grønne skoger (1996)
- Lykkelandet Zanzibar (1997)
- Sputnik 11 (2001)
- Sputnik 12 (2001)
- Sputnik 13 (2003)
- Sputnik 20 (2006)
- Det er vanskelig å være beskjeden (2007)
- 50 år på veien (2009)
