= Blefjell =

Mountain area in Buskerud/Telemark, Norway

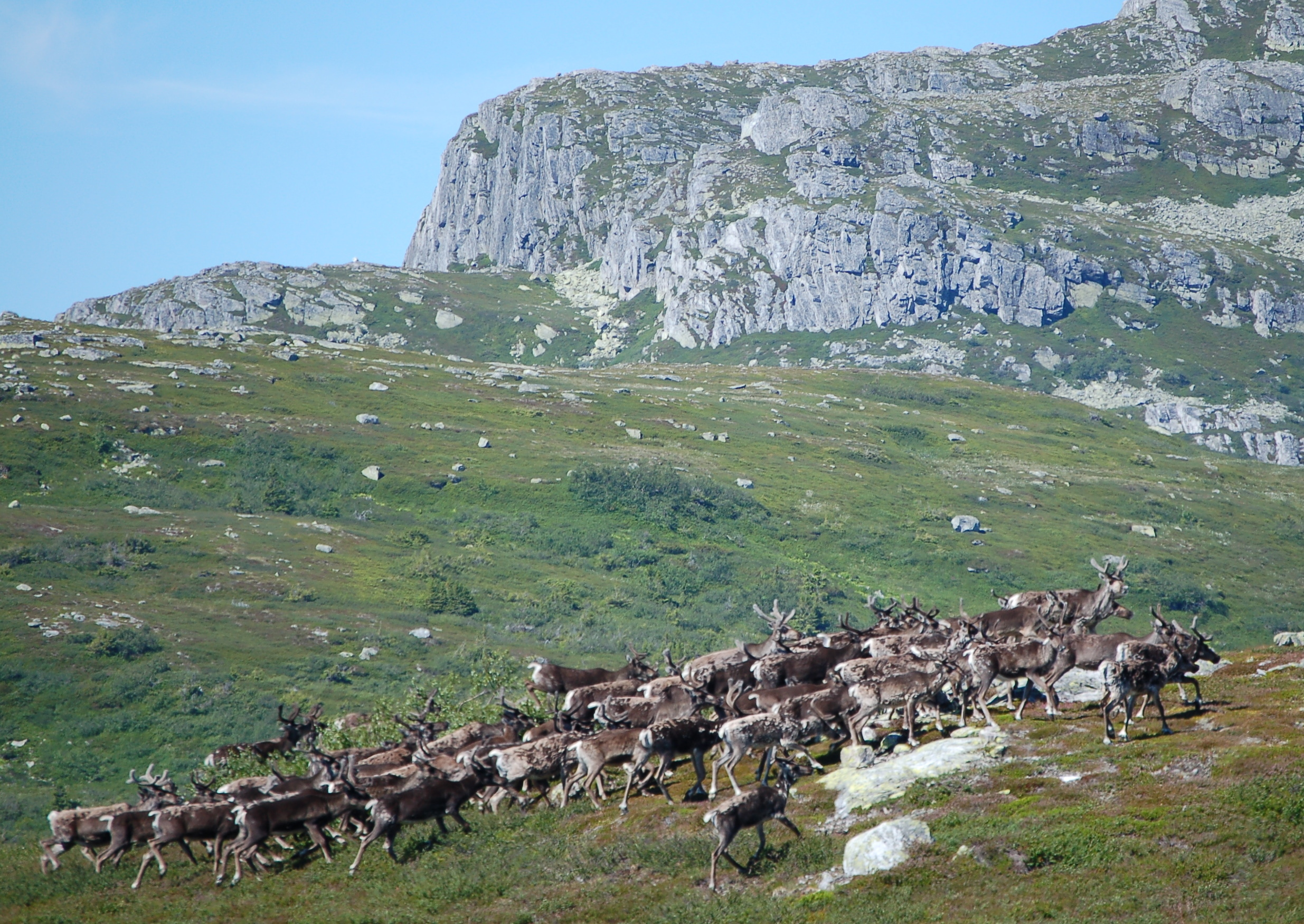
- View of wild reindeer at Blefjell

Highest point
- Peak: Bletoppen, Tinn Municipality, Norway
- Elevation: 1,340 m (4,400 ft)
- Prominence: 540 m (1,770 ft)
- Isolation: 0.41 km (0.25 mi)
- Coordinates: 59.80767°N 9.15277°E

Dimensions
- Length: 25 km (16 mi)
- Width: 5 km (3.1 mi)
- Area: 100 km^{2} (39 mi^{2})

Geography
- Location: Eastern Norway
- Range coordinates: 59.84854°N 9.19024°E

Blefjell is a small mountain range located along the border between Buskerud and Telemark counties in Norway. The highest point is Bletoppen, in Tinn Municipality, which reaches an elevation of 1,340 metres (4,400 ft) above sea level. The mountain range runs through the five municipalities of Rollag, Flesberg, Kongsberg, Notodden and Tinn.

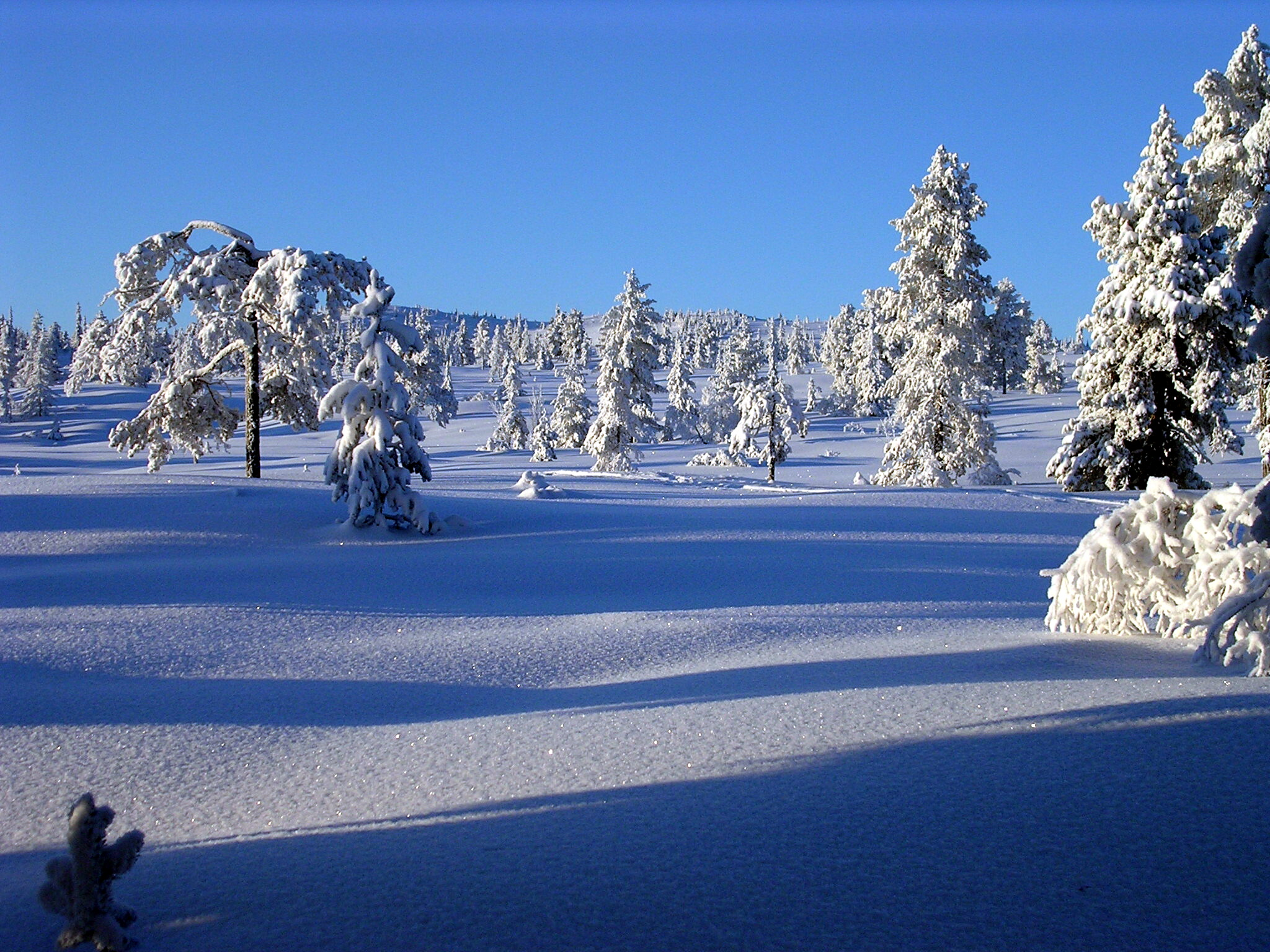
In winter

The bedrock in Blefjell is hard quartzite. The mountain area falls off steeply to the west and more gently to the east. The area is thus most easily accessible from the east (Flesberg) and from the south (Bolkesjø). The area is a popular tourist destination, being approximately 1 hour drive from Kongsberg. There are a number of mountain lodges, hotels, and cabins. The area also has several ski resorts. The Norwegian Trekking Association has three unattended tourist huts in the area: Sigridsbu, Eriksbu, and Øvre Fjellstul.

== See also ==
- List of mountains of Norway by height
