= Tørdal Church =

Church in Telemark, Norway

- Tørdal kirke
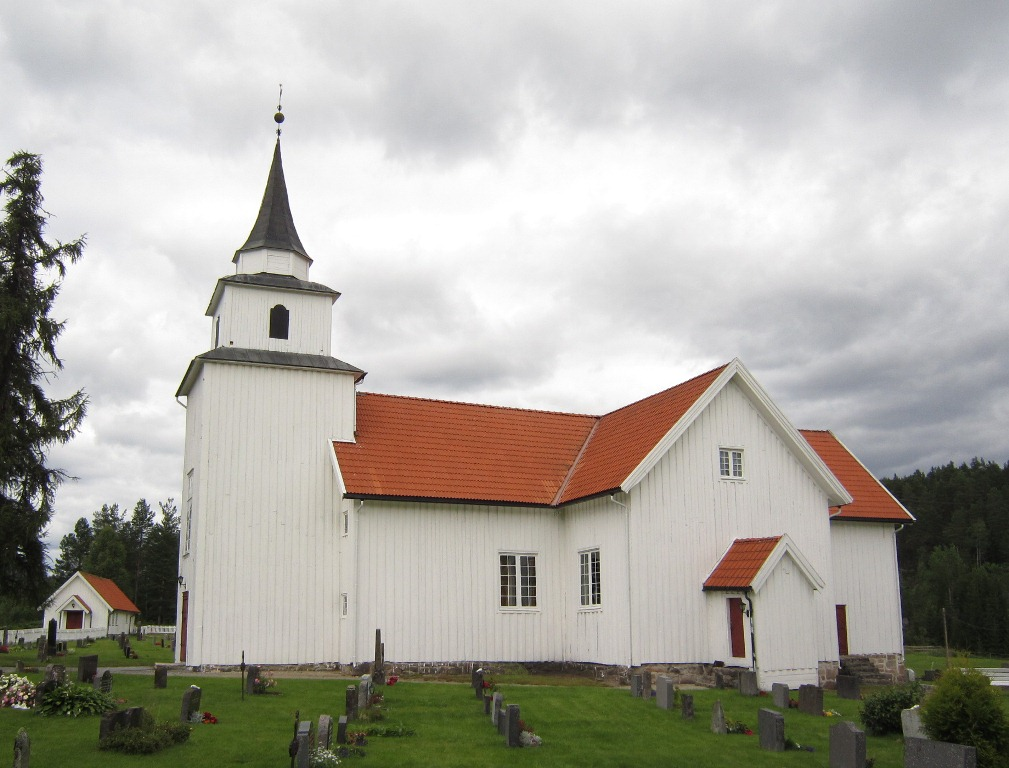
- View of the church
- Tørdal Church
- 59°09′18″N 8°48′38″E
- Location: Drangedal Municipality, Telemark
- Country: Norway
- Denomination: Church of Norway
- Previous denomination: Catholic Church
- Churchmanship: Evangelical Lutheran

History
- Former name: Tabor kirke
- Status: Parish church
- Founded: 13th century
- Consecrated: 20 July 1809

Architecture
- Functional status: Active
- Architect: Kittel Johnsen Bøe
- Architectural type: Cruciform
- Completed: 1809 (217 years ago)

Specifications
- Capacity: 300
- Materials: Wood

Administration
- Diocese: Agder og Telemark
- Deanery: Bamble prosti
- Parish: Tørdal
- Norwegian Cultural Heritage Site
- Type: Church
- Status: Automatically protected
- ID: 85707

Tørdal Church (Norwegian: Tørdal kirke) is a parish church of the Church of Norway in Drangedal Municipality in Telemark county, Norway. It is located in the village of Bø. It is the church for the Tørdal parish which is part of the Bamble prosti (deanery) in the Diocese of Agder og Telemark. The white, wooden church was built in a cruciform design in 1809 using plans drawn up by the architect K. Johnsen Bøe. The church seats about 300 people.

== History ==
The earliest existing historical records of the church date back to the year 1395, but the church was not built that year. The first church in Bø was a wooden stave church that may have been built during the 13th century. Several repairs were carried out on the old stave church over the years, including in 1630-1634 and again in 1717 to help save the centuries-old structure. In 1748, the old church was replaced by a new wooden church on the same site. This church was called Tabor Church. By the 1800s, this church was considered to be too small and in poor condition so it was decided to build a new one. In 1809, a new church was built by Kittel Johnsen Bøe on the same site. The new church was consecrated on 20 July 1809. The new church is a cruciform design with a church porch and bell tower on the wets end. There is a choir and sacristy in the east transept. There is a pulpit altar in the choir. In 1883, a new pulpit was built at the intersection of the eastern and northern transepts which is now in use, although the original pulpit altar is still in place. There was a major renovation in 1910, when the church got a new tower along with several other improvements.

== See also ==
- List of churches in Agder og Telemark
