= Tørdal =

Valley in Telemark, Norway

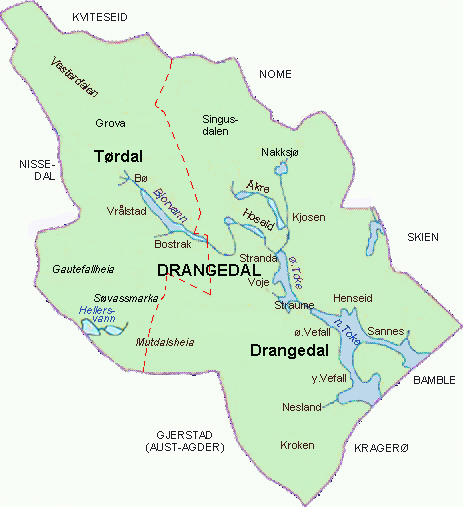
- Tørdal covers the northern parts of Drangedal Municipality

Geology
- Type: River valley

Geography
- Location: Telemark, Norway
- Coordinates: 59.2190°N 8.7134°E

Location
- Interactive map of Tørdal

Tørdal is a valley and parish that makes up the northern third of Drangedal Municipality in Telemark county, Norway. Tørdal is centered around the village of Bø where the Tørdal Church is located. Another village in the valley is Bustrak. Historically, the Tørdal area was considered part of Telemark while the rest of Drangedal was considered part of Grenland.
