= Jonsknuten =

Mountain in Buskerud, Norway

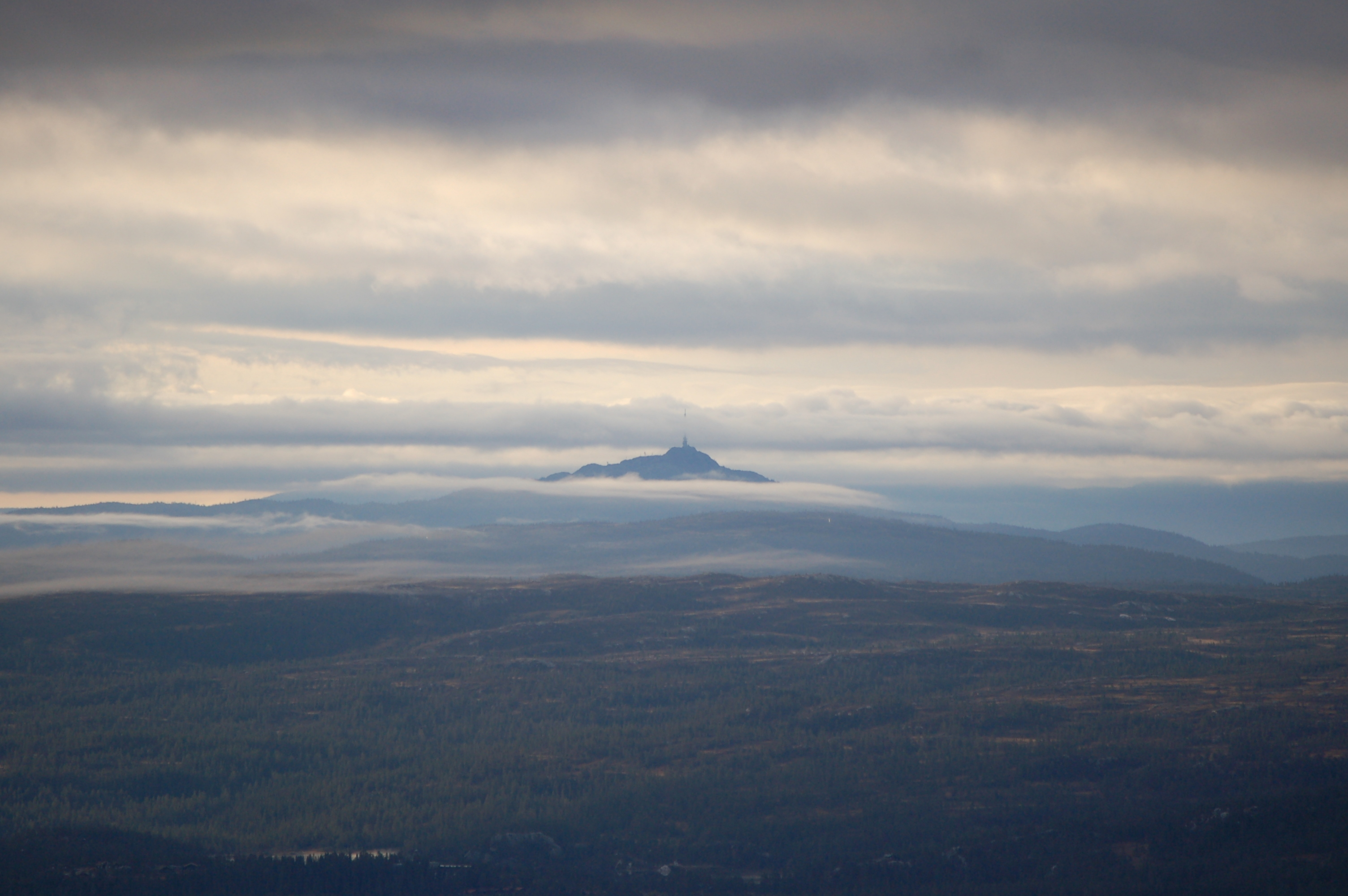
- Jonsknuten seen from Storeble

Highest point
- Elevation: 904 m (2,966 ft)
- Prominence: 409 m (1,342 ft)
- Isolation: 18.2 km (11.3 mi)
- Listing: Highest point in Kongsberg Municipality
- Coordinates: 59°40′15″N 9°31′19″E

Geography
- Location: Buskerud, Norway

Jonsknuten is a mountain in Kongsberg Municipality in Buskerud county, Norway. It is the highest point in the municipality at 904 m (2,966 ft). The 904-metre (2,966 ft) tall mountain is located about 7 kilometres (4.3 mi) west of the town of Kongsberg.

== Description ==
Jonsknuten has a topographic prominence of 409 m (1,342 ft) and lies about 18.2 km (11.3 mi) from the nearest higher summit. About 1 km (0.62 mi) below the summit stands Knutehytta, a year-round hiking cabin built in 1929 on the initiative of the Kongsberg Sports Association; the surrounding terrain is used for skiing. A cable car runs from the end of the access road to the summit, used for maintenance of the transmission mast.

At the summit stands a 92 m (302 ft) self-supporting reinforced-concrete transmission tower, completed in 1961, which carries radio and television transmitters and a GSM base station.

== See also ==
- List of mountains of Norway by height
