= Lifjell (Kongsberg) =

Mountain in Buskerud, Norway

Highest point
- Elevation: 556 m (1,824 ft)
- Prominence: 86 m (282 ft)
- Isolation: 3.3 km (2.1 mi)
- Coordinates: 59°33′48″N 9°44′49″E

Geography
- Location: Buskerud, Norway

Lifjell is a small mountain in Kongsberg Municipality in Buskerud county, Norway. The 556-metre (1,824 ft) tall mountain is located about 12 kilometres (7.5 mi) southeast of the town of Kongsberg and it lies northeast of the Skrimfjella mountain area.

== See also ==
- List of mountains of Norway by height
